

549001–549100 

|-bgcolor=#d6d6d6
| 549001 ||  || — || September 24, 2008 || Mount Lemmon || Mount Lemmon Survey ||  || align=right | 3.7 km || 
|-id=002 bgcolor=#E9E9E9
| 549002 ||  || — || January 26, 2011 || Mount Lemmon || Mount Lemmon Survey ||  || align=right | 1.9 km || 
|-id=003 bgcolor=#d6d6d6
| 549003 ||  || — || February 4, 2006 || Kitt Peak || Spacewatch ||  || align=right | 1.9 km || 
|-id=004 bgcolor=#fefefe
| 549004 ||  || — || January 28, 2011 || Mount Lemmon || Mount Lemmon Survey || H || align=right data-sort-value="0.57" | 570 m || 
|-id=005 bgcolor=#fefefe
| 549005 ||  || — || January 16, 2004 || Palomar || NEAT ||  || align=right data-sort-value="0.75" | 750 m || 
|-id=006 bgcolor=#d6d6d6
| 549006 ||  || — || January 30, 2011 || Piszkesteto || Z. Kuli, K. Sárneczky ||  || align=right | 2.3 km || 
|-id=007 bgcolor=#fefefe
| 549007 ||  || — || January 30, 2011 || Piszkesteto || Z. Kuli, K. Sárneczky ||  || align=right data-sort-value="0.78" | 780 m || 
|-id=008 bgcolor=#fefefe
| 549008 ||  || — || January 31, 2011 || Piszkesteto || Z. Kuli, K. Sárneczky ||  || align=right data-sort-value="0.65" | 650 m || 
|-id=009 bgcolor=#E9E9E9
| 549009 ||  || — || January 31, 2011 || Piszkesteto || Z. Kuli, K. Sárneczky ||  || align=right | 2.8 km || 
|-id=010 bgcolor=#d6d6d6
| 549010 ||  || — || January 31, 2011 || Piszkesteto || Z. Kuli, K. Sárneczky ||  || align=right | 2.2 km || 
|-id=011 bgcolor=#E9E9E9
| 549011 ||  || — || January 30, 2011 || Mount Lemmon || Mount Lemmon Survey ||  || align=right | 2.7 km || 
|-id=012 bgcolor=#fefefe
| 549012 ||  || — || October 1, 2003 || Kitt Peak || Spacewatch ||  || align=right data-sort-value="0.90" | 900 m || 
|-id=013 bgcolor=#E9E9E9
| 549013 ||  || — || August 31, 2005 || Palomar || NEAT || HNS || align=right | 1.2 km || 
|-id=014 bgcolor=#E9E9E9
| 549014 ||  || — || January 30, 2011 || Mayhill-ISON || L. Elenin ||  || align=right | 2.2 km || 
|-id=015 bgcolor=#fefefe
| 549015 ||  || — || September 28, 2006 || Kitt Peak || Spacewatch ||  || align=right data-sort-value="0.62" | 620 m || 
|-id=016 bgcolor=#fefefe
| 549016 ||  || — || September 28, 2006 || Catalina || CSS ||  || align=right data-sort-value="0.78" | 780 m || 
|-id=017 bgcolor=#d6d6d6
| 549017 ||  || — || January 27, 2011 || Kitt Peak || Spacewatch ||  || align=right | 1.9 km || 
|-id=018 bgcolor=#E9E9E9
| 549018 ||  || — || January 27, 2011 || Kitt Peak || Spacewatch ||  || align=right | 2.7 km || 
|-id=019 bgcolor=#fefefe
| 549019 ||  || — || November 26, 2003 || Kitt Peak || Spacewatch ||  || align=right data-sort-value="0.65" | 650 m || 
|-id=020 bgcolor=#E9E9E9
| 549020 ||  || — || September 28, 2009 || Kitt Peak || Spacewatch ||  || align=right | 2.0 km || 
|-id=021 bgcolor=#E9E9E9
| 549021 ||  || — || July 5, 2008 || Siding Spring || SSS ||  || align=right | 2.8 km || 
|-id=022 bgcolor=#E9E9E9
| 549022 ||  || — || August 15, 2004 || Cerro Tololo || Cerro Tololo Obs. ||  || align=right | 1.8 km || 
|-id=023 bgcolor=#fefefe
| 549023 ||  || — || September 26, 2002 || Palomar || NEAT ||  || align=right data-sort-value="0.71" | 710 m || 
|-id=024 bgcolor=#fefefe
| 549024 ||  || — || November 19, 2006 || Kitt Peak || Spacewatch ||  || align=right data-sort-value="0.68" | 680 m || 
|-id=025 bgcolor=#fefefe
| 549025 ||  || — || November 14, 2006 || Catalina || CSS ||  || align=right data-sort-value="0.90" | 900 m || 
|-id=026 bgcolor=#fefefe
| 549026 ||  || — || September 25, 2006 || Kitt Peak || Spacewatch ||  || align=right data-sort-value="0.62" | 620 m || 
|-id=027 bgcolor=#fefefe
| 549027 ||  || — || February 25, 2011 || Mount Lemmon || Mount Lemmon Survey ||  || align=right data-sort-value="0.54" | 540 m || 
|-id=028 bgcolor=#fefefe
| 549028 ||  || — || February 10, 2011 || Mount Lemmon || Mount Lemmon Survey ||  || align=right data-sort-value="0.82" | 820 m || 
|-id=029 bgcolor=#fefefe
| 549029 ||  || — || July 18, 2001 || Kitt Peak || Spacewatch ||  || align=right data-sort-value="0.86" | 860 m || 
|-id=030 bgcolor=#E9E9E9
| 549030 ||  || — || August 22, 2004 || Kitt Peak || Spacewatch ||  || align=right | 3.2 km || 
|-id=031 bgcolor=#E9E9E9
| 549031 ||  || — || January 27, 2011 || Mount Lemmon || Mount Lemmon Survey ||  || align=right | 2.2 km || 
|-id=032 bgcolor=#E9E9E9
| 549032 ||  || — || March 12, 2007 || Catalina || CSS ||  || align=right | 2.3 km || 
|-id=033 bgcolor=#fefefe
| 549033 ||  || — || March 5, 2008 || Kitt Peak || Spacewatch ||  || align=right data-sort-value="0.52" | 520 m || 
|-id=034 bgcolor=#E9E9E9
| 549034 ||  || — || March 10, 2007 || Mount Lemmon || Mount Lemmon Survey ||  || align=right | 1.9 km || 
|-id=035 bgcolor=#fefefe
| 549035 ||  || — || December 8, 2010 || Mount Lemmon || Mount Lemmon Survey ||  || align=right data-sort-value="0.65" | 650 m || 
|-id=036 bgcolor=#FA8072
| 549036 ||  || — || January 30, 2004 || Kitt Peak || Spacewatch ||  || align=right data-sort-value="0.59" | 590 m || 
|-id=037 bgcolor=#fefefe
| 549037 ||  || — || August 26, 2006 || Lulin || LUSS ||  || align=right data-sort-value="0.82" | 820 m || 
|-id=038 bgcolor=#d6d6d6
| 549038 ||  || — || January 29, 2011 || Mount Lemmon || Mount Lemmon Survey ||  || align=right | 2.1 km || 
|-id=039 bgcolor=#fefefe
| 549039 ||  || — || November 23, 2006 || Mount Lemmon || Mount Lemmon Survey ||  || align=right data-sort-value="0.71" | 710 m || 
|-id=040 bgcolor=#E9E9E9
| 549040 ||  || — || January 29, 2011 || Mount Lemmon || Mount Lemmon Survey ||  || align=right | 1.9 km || 
|-id=041 bgcolor=#fefefe
| 549041 ||  || — || August 28, 2006 || Kitt Peak || Spacewatch ||  || align=right data-sort-value="0.71" | 710 m || 
|-id=042 bgcolor=#d6d6d6
| 549042 ||  || — || January 29, 2011 || Kitt Peak || Spacewatch ||  || align=right | 2.4 km || 
|-id=043 bgcolor=#fefefe
| 549043 ||  || — || September 12, 2009 || Kitt Peak || Spacewatch ||  || align=right data-sort-value="0.52" | 520 m || 
|-id=044 bgcolor=#fefefe
| 549044 ||  || — || January 23, 2011 || Mount Lemmon || Mount Lemmon Survey ||  || align=right data-sort-value="0.54" | 540 m || 
|-id=045 bgcolor=#E9E9E9
| 549045 ||  || — || November 22, 2005 || Catalina || CSS ||  || align=right | 2.2 km || 
|-id=046 bgcolor=#d6d6d6
| 549046 ||  || — || January 3, 2011 || Piszkesteto || Z. Kuli, K. Sárneczky || (1118) || align=right | 3.7 km || 
|-id=047 bgcolor=#d6d6d6
| 549047 ||  || — || February 2, 2006 || Kitt Peak || Spacewatch ||  || align=right | 2.8 km || 
|-id=048 bgcolor=#d6d6d6
| 549048 ||  || — || January 11, 2011 || Kitt Peak || Spacewatch ||  || align=right | 2.2 km || 
|-id=049 bgcolor=#fefefe
| 549049 ||  || — || February 7, 2011 || Mount Lemmon || Mount Lemmon Survey ||  || align=right data-sort-value="0.64" | 640 m || 
|-id=050 bgcolor=#d6d6d6
| 549050 ||  || — || July 5, 2003 || Kitt Peak || Spacewatch ||  || align=right | 2.8 km || 
|-id=051 bgcolor=#d6d6d6
| 549051 ||  || — || January 27, 2011 || Mount Lemmon || Mount Lemmon Survey ||  || align=right | 1.8 km || 
|-id=052 bgcolor=#E9E9E9
| 549052 ||  || — || January 27, 2011 || Mount Lemmon || Mount Lemmon Survey ||  || align=right | 2.0 km || 
|-id=053 bgcolor=#E9E9E9
| 549053 ||  || — || November 17, 2009 || Mount Lemmon || Mount Lemmon Survey ||  || align=right | 2.4 km || 
|-id=054 bgcolor=#E9E9E9
| 549054 ||  || — || January 27, 2011 || Mount Lemmon || Mount Lemmon Survey ||  || align=right | 2.3 km || 
|-id=055 bgcolor=#d6d6d6
| 549055 ||  || — || January 28, 2011 || Kitt Peak || Spacewatch ||  || align=right | 1.8 km || 
|-id=056 bgcolor=#E9E9E9
| 549056 ||  || — || January 28, 2011 || Mount Lemmon || Mount Lemmon Survey ||  || align=right | 2.5 km || 
|-id=057 bgcolor=#E9E9E9
| 549057 ||  || — || January 28, 2011 || Mount Lemmon || Mount Lemmon Survey ||  || align=right | 2.1 km || 
|-id=058 bgcolor=#E9E9E9
| 549058 ||  || — || January 29, 2011 || Mount Lemmon || Mount Lemmon Survey ||  || align=right | 2.2 km || 
|-id=059 bgcolor=#E9E9E9
| 549059 ||  || — || January 29, 2011 || Mount Lemmon || Mount Lemmon Survey ||  || align=right | 2.3 km || 
|-id=060 bgcolor=#E9E9E9
| 549060 ||  || — || September 22, 2009 || Kitt Peak || Spacewatch ||  || align=right | 1.9 km || 
|-id=061 bgcolor=#d6d6d6
| 549061 ||  || — || January 29, 2011 || Mount Lemmon || Mount Lemmon Survey ||  || align=right | 2.5 km || 
|-id=062 bgcolor=#d6d6d6
| 549062 ||  || — || April 16, 2008 || Mount Lemmon || Mount Lemmon Survey ||  || align=right | 3.4 km || 
|-id=063 bgcolor=#d6d6d6
| 549063 ||  || — || January 29, 2011 || Mount Lemmon || Mount Lemmon Survey ||  || align=right | 2.4 km || 
|-id=064 bgcolor=#d6d6d6
| 549064 ||  || — || January 29, 2011 || Mount Lemmon || Mount Lemmon Survey ||  || align=right | 2.3 km || 
|-id=065 bgcolor=#d6d6d6
| 549065 ||  || — || January 29, 2011 || Mount Lemmon || Mount Lemmon Survey ||  || align=right | 2.0 km || 
|-id=066 bgcolor=#d6d6d6
| 549066 ||  || — || January 29, 2011 || Mount Lemmon || Mount Lemmon Survey ||  || align=right | 2.2 km || 
|-id=067 bgcolor=#fefefe
| 549067 ||  || — || April 30, 2005 || Kitt Peak || Spacewatch ||  || align=right data-sort-value="0.54" | 540 m || 
|-id=068 bgcolor=#E9E9E9
| 549068 ||  || — || October 29, 2010 || Mount Lemmon || Mount Lemmon Survey ||  || align=right | 1.8 km || 
|-id=069 bgcolor=#fefefe
| 549069 ||  || — || January 27, 2011 || Mount Lemmon || Mount Lemmon Survey ||  || align=right data-sort-value="0.54" | 540 m || 
|-id=070 bgcolor=#d6d6d6
| 549070 ||  || — || January 27, 2011 || Mount Lemmon || Mount Lemmon Survey ||  || align=right | 2.1 km || 
|-id=071 bgcolor=#fefefe
| 549071 ||  || — || January 17, 2011 || Mount Lemmon || Mount Lemmon Survey ||  || align=right data-sort-value="0.55" | 550 m || 
|-id=072 bgcolor=#fefefe
| 549072 ||  || — || January 29, 2011 || Mount Lemmon || Mount Lemmon Survey ||  || align=right data-sort-value="0.75" | 750 m || 
|-id=073 bgcolor=#E9E9E9
| 549073 ||  || — || February 7, 2002 || Palomar || NEAT || AGN || align=right | 1.6 km || 
|-id=074 bgcolor=#fefefe
| 549074 ||  || — || January 13, 2011 || Kitt Peak || Spacewatch ||  || align=right data-sort-value="0.78" | 780 m || 
|-id=075 bgcolor=#d6d6d6
| 549075 ||  || — || February 25, 2011 || Mount Lemmon || Mount Lemmon Survey ||  || align=right | 1.8 km || 
|-id=076 bgcolor=#d6d6d6
| 549076 ||  || — || August 8, 2013 || Haleakala || Pan-STARRS ||  || align=right | 2.0 km || 
|-id=077 bgcolor=#fefefe
| 549077 ||  || — || February 13, 2011 || Mount Lemmon || Mount Lemmon Survey ||  || align=right data-sort-value="0.73" | 730 m || 
|-id=078 bgcolor=#E9E9E9
| 549078 ||  || — || January 29, 2011 || Mount Lemmon || Mount Lemmon Survey ||  || align=right | 1.8 km || 
|-id=079 bgcolor=#E9E9E9
| 549079 ||  || — || August 8, 2013 || Kitt Peak || Spacewatch ||  || align=right | 2.3 km || 
|-id=080 bgcolor=#fefefe
| 549080 ||  || — || January 28, 2011 || Mount Lemmon || Mount Lemmon Survey ||  || align=right data-sort-value="0.86" | 860 m || 
|-id=081 bgcolor=#d6d6d6
| 549081 ||  || — || February 11, 2011 || Mount Lemmon || Mount Lemmon Survey ||  || align=right | 2.2 km || 
|-id=082 bgcolor=#d6d6d6
| 549082 ||  || — || July 14, 2013 || Haleakala || Pan-STARRS ||  || align=right | 1.9 km || 
|-id=083 bgcolor=#fefefe
| 549083 ||  || — || February 13, 2011 || Mount Lemmon || Mount Lemmon Survey ||  || align=right data-sort-value="0.75" | 750 m || 
|-id=084 bgcolor=#d6d6d6
| 549084 ||  || — || January 9, 2015 || Haleakala || Pan-STARRS ||  || align=right | 2.1 km || 
|-id=085 bgcolor=#d6d6d6
| 549085 ||  || — || October 26, 2009 || Mount Lemmon || Mount Lemmon Survey ||  || align=right | 2.0 km || 
|-id=086 bgcolor=#E9E9E9
| 549086 ||  || — || February 6, 2016 || Haleakala || Pan-STARRS ||  || align=right | 2.1 km || 
|-id=087 bgcolor=#fefefe
| 549087 ||  || — || January 28, 2011 || Mount Lemmon || Mount Lemmon Survey || H || align=right data-sort-value="0.45" | 450 m || 
|-id=088 bgcolor=#fefefe
| 549088 ||  || — || February 14, 2004 || Palomar || NEAT ||  || align=right data-sort-value="0.98" | 980 m || 
|-id=089 bgcolor=#fefefe
| 549089 ||  || — || February 5, 2011 || Kitt Peak || Spacewatch ||  || align=right data-sort-value="0.75" | 750 m || 
|-id=090 bgcolor=#fefefe
| 549090 ||  || — || February 5, 2011 || Mount Lemmon || Mount Lemmon Survey ||  || align=right data-sort-value="0.65" | 650 m || 
|-id=091 bgcolor=#d6d6d6
| 549091 ||  || — || February 7, 2006 || Mount Lemmon || Mount Lemmon Survey ||  || align=right | 3.4 km || 
|-id=092 bgcolor=#d6d6d6
| 549092 ||  || — || February 5, 2011 || Mount Lemmon || Mount Lemmon Survey ||  || align=right | 2.1 km || 
|-id=093 bgcolor=#E9E9E9
| 549093 ||  || — || January 30, 2011 || Kitt Peak || Spacewatch ||  || align=right | 2.5 km || 
|-id=094 bgcolor=#d6d6d6
| 549094 ||  || — || January 17, 2011 || Mount Lemmon || Mount Lemmon Survey ||  || align=right | 3.1 km || 
|-id=095 bgcolor=#E9E9E9
| 549095 ||  || — || February 4, 2011 || Mayhill-ISON || L. Elenin ||  || align=right | 2.0 km || 
|-id=096 bgcolor=#E9E9E9
| 549096 ||  || — || January 11, 2011 || Mount Lemmon || Mount Lemmon Survey ||  || align=right | 1.4 km || 
|-id=097 bgcolor=#E9E9E9
| 549097 ||  || — || January 27, 2011 || Mount Lemmon || Mount Lemmon Survey ||  || align=right | 1.8 km || 
|-id=098 bgcolor=#fefefe
| 549098 ||  || — || May 13, 2004 || Palomar || NEAT ||  || align=right data-sort-value="0.96" | 960 m || 
|-id=099 bgcolor=#E9E9E9
| 549099 ||  || — || February 13, 2002 || Kitt Peak || Spacewatch ||  || align=right | 3.5 km || 
|-id=100 bgcolor=#fefefe
| 549100 ||  || — || July 13, 2001 || Palomar || NEAT || H || align=right data-sort-value="0.49" | 490 m || 
|}

549101–549200 

|-bgcolor=#fefefe
| 549101 ||  || — || December 29, 2003 || Kitt Peak || Spacewatch ||  || align=right data-sort-value="0.78" | 780 m || 
|-id=102 bgcolor=#d6d6d6
| 549102 ||  || — || February 5, 2011 || Mount Lemmon || Mount Lemmon Survey ||  || align=right | 2.1 km || 
|-id=103 bgcolor=#d6d6d6
| 549103 ||  || — || March 26, 2007 || Mount Lemmon || Mount Lemmon Survey ||  || align=right | 2.0 km || 
|-id=104 bgcolor=#E9E9E9
| 549104 ||  || — || December 7, 2005 || Kitt Peak || Spacewatch ||  || align=right | 1.7 km || 
|-id=105 bgcolor=#fefefe
| 549105 ||  || — || December 21, 2000 || Kitt Peak || Spacewatch ||  || align=right data-sort-value="0.68" | 680 m || 
|-id=106 bgcolor=#fefefe
| 549106 ||  || — || February 8, 2011 || Mount Lemmon || Mount Lemmon Survey ||  || align=right data-sort-value="0.57" | 570 m || 
|-id=107 bgcolor=#d6d6d6
| 549107 ||  || — || January 31, 2011 || Piszkesteto || Z. Kuli, K. Sárneczky ||  || align=right | 1.8 km || 
|-id=108 bgcolor=#E9E9E9
| 549108 ||  || — || February 8, 2011 || Mount Lemmon || Mount Lemmon Survey ||  || align=right | 1.7 km || 
|-id=109 bgcolor=#fefefe
| 549109 ||  || — || March 31, 2008 || Vail-Jarnac || Jarnac Obs. ||  || align=right data-sort-value="0.65" | 650 m || 
|-id=110 bgcolor=#fefefe
| 549110 ||  || — || February 24, 2006 || Palomar || NEAT || H || align=right data-sort-value="0.90" | 900 m || 
|-id=111 bgcolor=#fefefe
| 549111 ||  || — || April 6, 2005 || Mount Lemmon || Mount Lemmon Survey ||  || align=right data-sort-value="0.62" | 620 m || 
|-id=112 bgcolor=#d6d6d6
| 549112 ||  || — || February 7, 2011 || Mount Lemmon || Mount Lemmon Survey ||  || align=right | 1.9 km || 
|-id=113 bgcolor=#E9E9E9
| 549113 ||  || — || February 8, 2011 || Mount Lemmon || Mount Lemmon Survey ||  || align=right | 2.0 km || 
|-id=114 bgcolor=#fefefe
| 549114 ||  || — || July 3, 2005 || Siding Spring || SSS ||  || align=right data-sort-value="0.90" | 900 m || 
|-id=115 bgcolor=#fefefe
| 549115 ||  || — || March 12, 2008 || Kitt Peak || Spacewatch ||  || align=right data-sort-value="0.62" | 620 m || 
|-id=116 bgcolor=#d6d6d6
| 549116 ||  || — || February 12, 2011 || Sandlot || G. Hug ||  || align=right | 3.4 km || 
|-id=117 bgcolor=#E9E9E9
| 549117 ||  || — || August 21, 2008 || Kitt Peak || Spacewatch ||  || align=right | 3.1 km || 
|-id=118 bgcolor=#E9E9E9
| 549118 ||  || — || January 7, 2006 || Kitt Peak || Spacewatch ||  || align=right | 2.8 km || 
|-id=119 bgcolor=#d6d6d6
| 549119 ||  || — || October 22, 2009 || Mount Lemmon || Mount Lemmon Survey ||  || align=right | 2.1 km || 
|-id=120 bgcolor=#d6d6d6
| 549120 ||  || — || April 16, 2007 || Mount Lemmon || Mount Lemmon Survey ||  || align=right | 2.3 km || 
|-id=121 bgcolor=#fefefe
| 549121 ||  || — || October 18, 2006 || Piszkesteto || K. Sárneczky ||  || align=right data-sort-value="0.68" | 680 m || 
|-id=122 bgcolor=#d6d6d6
| 549122 ||  || — || February 10, 2011 || Mount Lemmon || Mount Lemmon Survey ||  || align=right | 2.2 km || 
|-id=123 bgcolor=#d6d6d6
| 549123 ||  || — || February 5, 2011 || Haleakala || Pan-STARRS ||  || align=right | 1.9 km || 
|-id=124 bgcolor=#E9E9E9
| 549124 ||  || — || February 10, 2011 || Mount Lemmon || Mount Lemmon Survey ||  || align=right | 2.5 km || 
|-id=125 bgcolor=#fefefe
| 549125 ||  || — || December 13, 2006 || Kitt Peak || Spacewatch ||  || align=right data-sort-value="0.50" | 500 m || 
|-id=126 bgcolor=#fefefe
| 549126 ||  || — || February 5, 2011 || Haleakala || Pan-STARRS ||  || align=right data-sort-value="0.62" | 620 m || 
|-id=127 bgcolor=#d6d6d6
| 549127 ||  || — || September 20, 2003 || Kitt Peak || Spacewatch ||  || align=right | 3.2 km || 
|-id=128 bgcolor=#d6d6d6
| 549128 ||  || — || March 5, 2011 || Mount Lemmon || Mount Lemmon Survey ||  || align=right | 2.4 km || 
|-id=129 bgcolor=#d6d6d6
| 549129 ||  || — || September 6, 2008 || Mount Lemmon || Mount Lemmon Survey ||  || align=right | 2.0 km || 
|-id=130 bgcolor=#d6d6d6
| 549130 ||  || — || September 2, 2008 || Kitt Peak || Spacewatch || 7:4 || align=right | 2.2 km || 
|-id=131 bgcolor=#d6d6d6
| 549131 ||  || — || February 25, 2011 || Mount Lemmon || Mount Lemmon Survey ||  || align=right | 2.1 km || 
|-id=132 bgcolor=#d6d6d6
| 549132 ||  || — || November 10, 2009 || Mount Lemmon || Mount Lemmon Survey ||  || align=right | 2.3 km || 
|-id=133 bgcolor=#E9E9E9
| 549133 ||  || — || December 24, 2005 || Kitt Peak || Spacewatch ||  || align=right | 2.2 km || 
|-id=134 bgcolor=#E9E9E9
| 549134 ||  || — || January 5, 2006 || Kitt Peak || Spacewatch || AGN || align=right | 1.0 km || 
|-id=135 bgcolor=#d6d6d6
| 549135 ||  || — || November 7, 2005 || Mauna Kea || Mauna Kea Obs. ||  || align=right | 2.3 km || 
|-id=136 bgcolor=#fefefe
| 549136 ||  || — || January 4, 2011 || Mount Lemmon || Mount Lemmon Survey ||  || align=right data-sort-value="0.71" | 710 m || 
|-id=137 bgcolor=#fefefe
| 549137 ||  || — || February 8, 2011 || Catalina || CSS || H || align=right data-sort-value="0.62" | 620 m || 
|-id=138 bgcolor=#d6d6d6
| 549138 ||  || — || February 11, 2011 || Mount Lemmon || Mount Lemmon Survey ||  || align=right | 2.2 km || 
|-id=139 bgcolor=#d6d6d6
| 549139 ||  || — || February 26, 2011 || Mount Lemmon || Mount Lemmon Survey ||  || align=right | 1.8 km || 
|-id=140 bgcolor=#E9E9E9
| 549140 ||  || — || February 6, 2011 || Catalina || CSS ||  || align=right | 1.8 km || 
|-id=141 bgcolor=#fefefe
| 549141 ||  || — || April 6, 2008 || Mount Lemmon || Mount Lemmon Survey ||  || align=right data-sort-value="0.54" | 540 m || 
|-id=142 bgcolor=#fefefe
| 549142 ||  || — || February 12, 2011 || Mount Lemmon || Mount Lemmon Survey ||  || align=right data-sort-value="0.75" | 750 m || 
|-id=143 bgcolor=#fefefe
| 549143 ||  || — || March 3, 2000 || Apache Point || SDSS Collaboration ||  || align=right data-sort-value="0.86" | 860 m || 
|-id=144 bgcolor=#d6d6d6
| 549144 ||  || — || November 11, 2004 || Kitt Peak || Kitt Peak Obs. || KOR || align=right | 1.2 km || 
|-id=145 bgcolor=#fefefe
| 549145 ||  || — || December 28, 2003 || Kitt Peak || Spacewatch ||  || align=right data-sort-value="0.94" | 940 m || 
|-id=146 bgcolor=#fefefe
| 549146 ||  || — || January 17, 2007 || Palomar || NEAT ||  || align=right data-sort-value="0.63" | 630 m || 
|-id=147 bgcolor=#E9E9E9
| 549147 ||  || — || March 12, 2007 || Altschwendt || W. Ries ||  || align=right | 2.0 km || 
|-id=148 bgcolor=#E9E9E9
| 549148 ||  || — || February 25, 2011 || Mount Lemmon || Mount Lemmon Survey ||  || align=right | 2.0 km || 
|-id=149 bgcolor=#d6d6d6
| 549149 ||  || — || February 21, 2001 || Kitt Peak || Spacewatch ||  || align=right | 2.4 km || 
|-id=150 bgcolor=#fefefe
| 549150 ||  || — || April 29, 2008 || Mount Lemmon || Mount Lemmon Survey ||  || align=right data-sort-value="0.65" | 650 m || 
|-id=151 bgcolor=#fefefe
| 549151 ||  || — || February 24, 2011 || SM Montmagastrell || J. M. Bosch ||  || align=right data-sort-value="0.75" | 750 m || 
|-id=152 bgcolor=#fefefe
| 549152 ||  || — || April 10, 2005 || Kitt Peak || Kitt Peak Obs. ||  || align=right data-sort-value="0.59" | 590 m || 
|-id=153 bgcolor=#fefefe
| 549153 ||  || — || September 23, 2009 || Kitt Peak || Spacewatch ||  || align=right data-sort-value="0.73" | 730 m || 
|-id=154 bgcolor=#d6d6d6
| 549154 ||  || — || February 25, 2011 || Mount Lemmon || Mount Lemmon Survey ||  || align=right | 2.3 km || 
|-id=155 bgcolor=#E9E9E9
| 549155 ||  || — || February 1, 2006 || Mount Lemmon || Mount Lemmon Survey ||  || align=right | 2.3 km || 
|-id=156 bgcolor=#fefefe
| 549156 ||  || — || February 25, 2011 || Mount Lemmon || Mount Lemmon Survey ||  || align=right data-sort-value="0.62" | 620 m || 
|-id=157 bgcolor=#fefefe
| 549157 ||  || — || September 22, 2009 || Mount Lemmon || Mount Lemmon Survey ||  || align=right data-sort-value="0.71" | 710 m || 
|-id=158 bgcolor=#d6d6d6
| 549158 ||  || — || February 25, 2011 || Mount Lemmon || Mount Lemmon Survey ||  || align=right | 2.1 km || 
|-id=159 bgcolor=#d6d6d6
| 549159 ||  || — || February 25, 2011 || Mount Lemmon || Mount Lemmon Survey ||  || align=right | 3.4 km || 
|-id=160 bgcolor=#fefefe
| 549160 ||  || — || February 26, 2011 || Mount Lemmon || Mount Lemmon Survey ||  || align=right data-sort-value="0.65" | 650 m || 
|-id=161 bgcolor=#E9E9E9
| 549161 ||  || — || January 28, 2011 || Kitt Peak || Spacewatch ||  || align=right | 2.1 km || 
|-id=162 bgcolor=#d6d6d6
| 549162 ||  || — || September 25, 2008 || Mount Lemmon || Mount Lemmon Survey ||  || align=right | 2.5 km || 
|-id=163 bgcolor=#E9E9E9
| 549163 ||  || — || February 4, 2006 || Mount Lemmon || Mount Lemmon Survey ||  || align=right | 2.1 km || 
|-id=164 bgcolor=#d6d6d6
| 549164 ||  || — || February 26, 2011 || Mount Lemmon || Mount Lemmon Survey ||  || align=right | 2.5 km || 
|-id=165 bgcolor=#fefefe
| 549165 ||  || — || February 8, 2007 || Mount Lemmon || Mount Lemmon Survey ||  || align=right data-sort-value="0.90" | 900 m || 
|-id=166 bgcolor=#d6d6d6
| 549166 ||  || — || November 7, 2005 || Mauna Kea || Mauna Kea Obs. ||  || align=right | 2.8 km || 
|-id=167 bgcolor=#d6d6d6
| 549167 ||  || — || January 31, 2006 || Kitt Peak || Spacewatch ||  || align=right | 2.7 km || 
|-id=168 bgcolor=#d6d6d6
| 549168 ||  || — || February 10, 2011 || Mount Lemmon || Mount Lemmon Survey ||  || align=right | 2.1 km || 
|-id=169 bgcolor=#fefefe
| 549169 ||  || — || January 26, 2011 || Kitt Peak || Spacewatch ||  || align=right data-sort-value="0.78" | 780 m || 
|-id=170 bgcolor=#fefefe
| 549170 ||  || — || December 11, 2010 || Mount Lemmon || Mount Lemmon Survey ||  || align=right data-sort-value="0.75" | 750 m || 
|-id=171 bgcolor=#fefefe
| 549171 ||  || — || August 27, 2005 || Palomar || NEAT ||  || align=right data-sort-value="0.86" | 860 m || 
|-id=172 bgcolor=#E9E9E9
| 549172 ||  || — || April 24, 2007 || Mount Lemmon || Mount Lemmon Survey ||  || align=right | 2.8 km || 
|-id=173 bgcolor=#E9E9E9
| 549173 ||  || — || February 9, 2002 || Kitt Peak || Spacewatch ||  || align=right | 1.8 km || 
|-id=174 bgcolor=#E9E9E9
| 549174 ||  || — || February 12, 2011 || Mount Lemmon || Mount Lemmon Survey ||  || align=right | 2.0 km || 
|-id=175 bgcolor=#fefefe
| 549175 ||  || — || December 27, 2006 || Mount Lemmon || Mount Lemmon Survey ||  || align=right data-sort-value="0.94" | 940 m || 
|-id=176 bgcolor=#fefefe
| 549176 ||  || — || October 15, 1995 || Kitt Peak || Spacewatch ||  || align=right data-sort-value="0.98" | 980 m || 
|-id=177 bgcolor=#d6d6d6
| 549177 ||  || — || September 16, 2003 || Palomar || NEAT ||  || align=right | 2.9 km || 
|-id=178 bgcolor=#d6d6d6
| 549178 ||  || — || March 17, 2005 || Mount Lemmon || Mount Lemmon Survey ||  || align=right | 3.4 km || 
|-id=179 bgcolor=#d6d6d6
| 549179 ||  || — || August 2, 2002 || Campo Imperatore || A. Boattini ||  || align=right | 3.1 km || 
|-id=180 bgcolor=#d6d6d6
| 549180 ||  || — || January 8, 2011 || Mount Lemmon || Mount Lemmon Survey ||  || align=right | 2.7 km || 
|-id=181 bgcolor=#fefefe
| 549181 ||  || — || February 10, 2011 || Catalina || CSS || H || align=right data-sort-value="0.65" | 650 m || 
|-id=182 bgcolor=#fefefe
| 549182 ||  || — || August 5, 2005 || Palomar || NEAT ||  || align=right data-sort-value="0.75" | 750 m || 
|-id=183 bgcolor=#d6d6d6
| 549183 ||  || — || January 25, 2006 || Kitt Peak || Spacewatch ||  || align=right | 2.3 km || 
|-id=184 bgcolor=#fefefe
| 549184 ||  || — || March 24, 2006 || Anderson Mesa || LONEOS || H || align=right data-sort-value="0.62" | 620 m || 
|-id=185 bgcolor=#d6d6d6
| 549185 Herczeg ||  ||  || March 6, 2011 || Piszkesteto || J. Kelemen || Tj (2.98) || align=right | 2.6 km || 
|-id=186 bgcolor=#fefefe
| 549186 ||  || — || January 16, 2004 || Kitt Peak || Spacewatch ||  || align=right data-sort-value="0.59" | 590 m || 
|-id=187 bgcolor=#fefefe
| 549187 ||  || — || March 10, 2011 || Kitt Peak || Spacewatch ||  || align=right data-sort-value="0.62" | 620 m || 
|-id=188 bgcolor=#fefefe
| 549188 ||  || — || March 7, 2011 || Bergisch Gladbach || W. Bickel || H || align=right data-sort-value="0.78" | 780 m || 
|-id=189 bgcolor=#fefefe
| 549189 ||  || — || March 9, 2011 || Mount Lemmon || Mount Lemmon Survey ||  || align=right data-sort-value="0.68" | 680 m || 
|-id=190 bgcolor=#fefefe
| 549190 ||  || — || March 11, 2011 || Mayhill-ISON || L. Elenin ||  || align=right data-sort-value="0.78" | 780 m || 
|-id=191 bgcolor=#fefefe
| 549191 ||  || — || February 25, 2011 || Kitt Peak || Spacewatch ||  || align=right data-sort-value="0.68" | 680 m || 
|-id=192 bgcolor=#d6d6d6
| 549192 ||  || — || March 9, 2011 || Mount Lemmon || Mount Lemmon Survey ||  || align=right | 2.5 km || 
|-id=193 bgcolor=#E9E9E9
| 549193 ||  || — || March 9, 2011 || Mount Lemmon || Mount Lemmon Survey ||  || align=right | 1.7 km || 
|-id=194 bgcolor=#fefefe
| 549194 ||  || — || March 18, 2004 || Kitt Peak || Spacewatch ||  || align=right | 1.0 km || 
|-id=195 bgcolor=#fefefe
| 549195 ||  || — || March 11, 2011 || Kitt Peak || Spacewatch ||  || align=right data-sort-value="0.62" | 620 m || 
|-id=196 bgcolor=#d6d6d6
| 549196 ||  || — || January 13, 2005 || Kitt Peak || Spacewatch ||  || align=right | 3.1 km || 
|-id=197 bgcolor=#d6d6d6
| 549197 ||  || — || September 19, 1998 || Apache Point || SDSS Collaboration ||  || align=right | 2.8 km || 
|-id=198 bgcolor=#d6d6d6
| 549198 ||  || — || October 2, 2008 || Catalina || CSS ||  || align=right | 3.5 km || 
|-id=199 bgcolor=#d6d6d6
| 549199 ||  || — || September 29, 2009 || Kitt Peak || Spacewatch ||  || align=right | 2.7 km || 
|-id=200 bgcolor=#fefefe
| 549200 ||  || — || March 10, 2011 || Kitt Peak || Spacewatch ||  || align=right data-sort-value="0.55" | 550 m || 
|}

549201–549300 

|-bgcolor=#fefefe
| 549201 ||  || — || February 12, 2004 || Kitt Peak || Spacewatch ||  || align=right data-sort-value="0.78" | 780 m || 
|-id=202 bgcolor=#fefefe
| 549202 ||  || — || March 1, 2011 || Catalina || CSS || H || align=right data-sort-value="0.71" | 710 m || 
|-id=203 bgcolor=#d6d6d6
| 549203 ||  || — || March 2, 2011 || Wildberg || R. Apitzsch || EOS || align=right | 2.7 km || 
|-id=204 bgcolor=#d6d6d6
| 549204 ||  || — || March 10, 2011 || Mount Lemmon || Mount Lemmon Survey ||  || align=right | 2.7 km || 
|-id=205 bgcolor=#E9E9E9
| 549205 ||  || — || February 22, 2011 || Kitt Peak || Spacewatch ||  || align=right data-sort-value="0.96" | 960 m || 
|-id=206 bgcolor=#E9E9E9
| 549206 ||  || — || March 14, 2011 || Mount Lemmon || Mount Lemmon Survey ||  || align=right | 1.1 km || 
|-id=207 bgcolor=#fefefe
| 549207 ||  || — || September 3, 2005 || Mauna Kea || Mauna Kea Obs. ||  || align=right | 1.1 km || 
|-id=208 bgcolor=#fefefe
| 549208 ||  || — || September 16, 2009 || Kitt Peak || Spacewatch ||  || align=right data-sort-value="0.75" | 750 m || 
|-id=209 bgcolor=#fefefe
| 549209 ||  || — || March 4, 2011 || Mount Lemmon || Mount Lemmon Survey ||  || align=right data-sort-value="0.65" | 650 m || 
|-id=210 bgcolor=#fefefe
| 549210 ||  || — || March 14, 2011 || Mount Lemmon || Mount Lemmon Survey ||  || align=right data-sort-value="0.78" | 780 m || 
|-id=211 bgcolor=#d6d6d6
| 549211 ||  || — || March 2, 2011 || Kitt Peak || Spacewatch ||  || align=right | 2.3 km || 
|-id=212 bgcolor=#d6d6d6
| 549212 ||  || — || March 6, 2011 || Mount Lemmon || Mount Lemmon Survey ||  || align=right | 2.8 km || 
|-id=213 bgcolor=#d6d6d6
| 549213 ||  || — || March 10, 2011 || Mount Lemmon || Mount Lemmon Survey ||  || align=right | 3.0 km || 
|-id=214 bgcolor=#fefefe
| 549214 ||  || — || June 12, 2011 || Mount Lemmon || Mount Lemmon Survey ||  || align=right | 1.2 km || 
|-id=215 bgcolor=#d6d6d6
| 549215 ||  || — || September 14, 2013 || Haleakala || Pan-STARRS ||  || align=right | 2.8 km || 
|-id=216 bgcolor=#d6d6d6
| 549216 ||  || — || August 23, 2014 || Haleakala || Pan-STARRS ||  || align=right | 1.8 km || 
|-id=217 bgcolor=#d6d6d6
| 549217 ||  || — || October 24, 2008 || Catalina || CSS ||  || align=right | 2.9 km || 
|-id=218 bgcolor=#d6d6d6
| 549218 ||  || — || March 13, 2011 || Mount Lemmon || Mount Lemmon Survey ||  || align=right | 2.2 km || 
|-id=219 bgcolor=#fefefe
| 549219 ||  || — || March 4, 2011 || Mount Lemmon || Mount Lemmon Survey ||  || align=right data-sort-value="0.54" | 540 m || 
|-id=220 bgcolor=#fefefe
| 549220 ||  || — || March 11, 2011 || Kitt Peak || Spacewatch ||  || align=right data-sort-value="0.59" | 590 m || 
|-id=221 bgcolor=#fefefe
| 549221 ||  || — || October 3, 2006 || Mount Lemmon || Mount Lemmon Survey ||  || align=right data-sort-value="0.59" | 590 m || 
|-id=222 bgcolor=#d6d6d6
| 549222 ||  || — || March 2, 2011 || Mount Lemmon || Mount Lemmon Survey ||  || align=right | 2.3 km || 
|-id=223 bgcolor=#fefefe
| 549223 ||  || — || March 4, 2011 || Catalina || CSS ||  || align=right data-sort-value="0.82" | 820 m || 
|-id=224 bgcolor=#E9E9E9
| 549224 ||  || — || March 2, 2011 || Mount Lemmon || Mount Lemmon Survey ||  || align=right | 1.9 km || 
|-id=225 bgcolor=#d6d6d6
| 549225 ||  || — || March 6, 2011 || Mount Lemmon || Mount Lemmon Survey ||  || align=right | 2.1 km || 
|-id=226 bgcolor=#fefefe
| 549226 ||  || — || February 16, 2001 || Kitt Peak || Spacewatch ||  || align=right data-sort-value="0.68" | 680 m || 
|-id=227 bgcolor=#d6d6d6
| 549227 ||  || — || March 11, 2011 || Catalina || CSS ||  || align=right | 2.2 km || 
|-id=228 bgcolor=#d6d6d6
| 549228 Labuda ||  ||  || March 24, 2011 || Piszkesteto || S. Kürti, K. Sárneczky ||  || align=right | 3.1 km || 
|-id=229 bgcolor=#d6d6d6
| 549229 Bánjános ||  ||  || March 24, 2011 || Piszkesteto || S. Kürti, K. Sárneczky ||  || align=right | 3.1 km || 
|-id=230 bgcolor=#d6d6d6
| 549230 ||  || — || March 24, 2011 || Piszkesteto || Z. Kuli, K. Sárneczky ||  || align=right | 3.1 km || 
|-id=231 bgcolor=#d6d6d6
| 549231 ||  || — || September 28, 2003 || Apache Point || SDSS Collaboration || AEG || align=right | 2.9 km || 
|-id=232 bgcolor=#d6d6d6
| 549232 ||  || — || August 20, 2002 || Palomar || NEAT ||  || align=right | 3.5 km || 
|-id=233 bgcolor=#d6d6d6
| 549233 ||  || — || March 14, 2011 || Kitt Peak || Spacewatch ||  || align=right | 2.1 km || 
|-id=234 bgcolor=#E9E9E9
| 549234 ||  || — || March 24, 2011 || Piszkesteto || Z. Kuli, K. Sárneczky ||  || align=right | 2.2 km || 
|-id=235 bgcolor=#d6d6d6
| 549235 ||  || — || March 26, 2011 || Mount Lemmon || Mount Lemmon Survey ||  || align=right | 3.2 km || 
|-id=236 bgcolor=#fefefe
| 549236 ||  || — || March 27, 2011 || Kitt Peak || Spacewatch ||  || align=right data-sort-value="0.59" | 590 m || 
|-id=237 bgcolor=#d6d6d6
| 549237 ||  || — || March 29, 2011 || Piszkesteto || Z. Kuli, K. Sárneczky ||  || align=right | 3.2 km || 
|-id=238 bgcolor=#d6d6d6
| 549238 ||  || — || September 24, 2008 || Mount Lemmon || Mount Lemmon Survey || EOS || align=right | 1.8 km || 
|-id=239 bgcolor=#d6d6d6
| 549239 ||  || — || March 29, 2011 || Piszkesteto || Z. Kuli, K. Sárneczky ||  || align=right | 3.6 km || 
|-id=240 bgcolor=#d6d6d6
| 549240 ||  || — || March 29, 2011 || Piszkesteto || Z. Kuli, K. Sárneczky ||  || align=right | 2.4 km || 
|-id=241 bgcolor=#d6d6d6
| 549241 ||  || — || March 30, 2011 || Piszkesteto || Z. Kuli, K. Sárneczky ||  || align=right | 2.1 km || 
|-id=242 bgcolor=#d6d6d6
| 549242 ||  || — || December 20, 2009 || Kitt Peak || Spacewatch ||  || align=right | 3.1 km || 
|-id=243 bgcolor=#fefefe
| 549243 ||  || — || March 27, 2011 || Mount Lemmon || Mount Lemmon Survey ||  || align=right data-sort-value="0.70" | 700 m || 
|-id=244 bgcolor=#d6d6d6
| 549244 ||  || — || March 24, 2006 || Mount Lemmon || Mount Lemmon Survey ||  || align=right | 2.4 km || 
|-id=245 bgcolor=#d6d6d6
| 549245 ||  || — || September 17, 2003 || Kitt Peak || Spacewatch ||  || align=right | 2.6 km || 
|-id=246 bgcolor=#d6d6d6
| 549246 ||  || — || March 29, 2011 || Mount Lemmon || Mount Lemmon Survey ||  || align=right | 2.5 km || 
|-id=247 bgcolor=#d6d6d6
| 549247 ||  || — || October 8, 2008 || Kitt Peak || Spacewatch ||  || align=right | 2.8 km || 
|-id=248 bgcolor=#d6d6d6
| 549248 ||  || — || March 30, 2011 || Mount Lemmon || Mount Lemmon Survey ||  || align=right | 2.1 km || 
|-id=249 bgcolor=#d6d6d6
| 549249 ||  || — || March 30, 2011 || Piszkesteto || Z. Kuli, K. Sárneczky ||  || align=right | 2.7 km || 
|-id=250 bgcolor=#fefefe
| 549250 ||  || — || March 28, 2011 || Mount Lemmon || Mount Lemmon Survey ||  || align=right data-sort-value="0.57" | 570 m || 
|-id=251 bgcolor=#fefefe
| 549251 ||  || — || March 28, 2011 || Mount Lemmon || Mount Lemmon Survey ||  || align=right data-sort-value="0.69" | 690 m || 
|-id=252 bgcolor=#fefefe
| 549252 ||  || — || March 29, 2011 || Kitt Peak || Spacewatch ||  || align=right data-sort-value="0.68" | 680 m || 
|-id=253 bgcolor=#d6d6d6
| 549253 ||  || — || January 16, 2005 || Kitt Peak || Spacewatch || KOR || align=right | 1.6 km || 
|-id=254 bgcolor=#fefefe
| 549254 ||  || — || March 29, 2011 || Kitt Peak || Spacewatch ||  || align=right data-sort-value="0.68" | 680 m || 
|-id=255 bgcolor=#d6d6d6
| 549255 ||  || — || March 9, 2011 || Kitt Peak || Spacewatch ||  || align=right | 2.1 km || 
|-id=256 bgcolor=#fefefe
| 549256 ||  || — || March 9, 2011 || Moletai || K. Černis ||  || align=right data-sort-value="0.68" | 680 m || 
|-id=257 bgcolor=#d6d6d6
| 549257 ||  || — || October 23, 2008 || Kitt Peak || Spacewatch ||  || align=right | 2.7 km || 
|-id=258 bgcolor=#d6d6d6
| 549258 ||  || — || September 13, 2002 || Socorro || LINEAR ||  || align=right | 3.2 km || 
|-id=259 bgcolor=#fefefe
| 549259 ||  || — || March 30, 2011 || Mount Lemmon || Mount Lemmon Survey ||  || align=right data-sort-value="0.59" | 590 m || 
|-id=260 bgcolor=#d6d6d6
| 549260 ||  || — || March 11, 2011 || Kitt Peak || Spacewatch ||  || align=right | 2.7 km || 
|-id=261 bgcolor=#d6d6d6
| 549261 ||  || — || September 23, 2008 || Kitt Peak || Spacewatch ||  || align=right | 2.5 km || 
|-id=262 bgcolor=#fefefe
| 549262 ||  || — || March 27, 2011 || Mount Lemmon || Mount Lemmon Survey ||  || align=right data-sort-value="0.65" | 650 m || 
|-id=263 bgcolor=#fefefe
| 549263 ||  || — || March 27, 2011 || Mount Lemmon || Mount Lemmon Survey ||  || align=right data-sort-value="0.65" | 650 m || 
|-id=264 bgcolor=#d6d6d6
| 549264 ||  || — || February 1, 2006 || Kitt Peak || Spacewatch ||  || align=right | 3.1 km || 
|-id=265 bgcolor=#d6d6d6
| 549265 ||  || — || September 21, 2003 || Kitt Peak || Spacewatch ||  || align=right | 2.4 km || 
|-id=266 bgcolor=#fefefe
| 549266 ||  || — || October 4, 2006 || Mount Lemmon || Mount Lemmon Survey ||  || align=right data-sort-value="0.75" | 750 m || 
|-id=267 bgcolor=#fefefe
| 549267 ||  || — || March 29, 2011 || Mount Lemmon || Mount Lemmon Survey ||  || align=right data-sort-value="0.65" | 650 m || 
|-id=268 bgcolor=#d6d6d6
| 549268 ||  || — || April 16, 2001 || Kitt Peak || Spacewatch ||  || align=right | 2.5 km || 
|-id=269 bgcolor=#fefefe
| 549269 ||  || — || May 3, 2008 || Mount Lemmon || Mount Lemmon Survey ||  || align=right data-sort-value="0.65" | 650 m || 
|-id=270 bgcolor=#d6d6d6
| 549270 ||  || — || March 31, 2011 || Mount Lemmon || Mount Lemmon Survey ||  || align=right | 3.5 km || 
|-id=271 bgcolor=#fefefe
| 549271 ||  || — || August 6, 2005 || Palomar || NEAT ||  || align=right data-sort-value="0.93" | 930 m || 
|-id=272 bgcolor=#E9E9E9
| 549272 ||  || — || April 2, 2011 || Haleakala || Pan-STARRS ||  || align=right | 1.1 km || 
|-id=273 bgcolor=#fefefe
| 549273 ||  || — || September 19, 2009 || Mount Lemmon || Mount Lemmon Survey ||  || align=right data-sort-value="0.90" | 900 m || 
|-id=274 bgcolor=#d6d6d6
| 549274 ||  || — || December 20, 2009 || Kitt Peak || Spacewatch ||  || align=right | 3.3 km || 
|-id=275 bgcolor=#d6d6d6
| 549275 ||  || — || March 28, 2011 || Mount Lemmon || Mount Lemmon Survey ||  || align=right | 2.7 km || 
|-id=276 bgcolor=#fefefe
| 549276 ||  || — || September 27, 2009 || Kitt Peak || Spacewatch ||  || align=right data-sort-value="0.68" | 680 m || 
|-id=277 bgcolor=#d6d6d6
| 549277 ||  || — || December 10, 2004 || Kitt Peak || Spacewatch ||  || align=right | 1.9 km || 
|-id=278 bgcolor=#d6d6d6
| 549278 ||  || — || August 11, 2002 || Palomar || NEAT || EOS || align=right | 2.8 km || 
|-id=279 bgcolor=#fefefe
| 549279 ||  || — || September 24, 2009 || Mount Lemmon || Mount Lemmon Survey ||  || align=right data-sort-value="0.94" | 940 m || 
|-id=280 bgcolor=#fefefe
| 549280 ||  || — || September 18, 2009 || Mount Lemmon || Mount Lemmon Survey ||  || align=right data-sort-value="0.78" | 780 m || 
|-id=281 bgcolor=#fefefe
| 549281 ||  || — || October 29, 2017 || Haleakala || Pan-STARRS ||  || align=right data-sort-value="0.68" | 680 m || 
|-id=282 bgcolor=#d6d6d6
| 549282 ||  || — || April 5, 2011 || Mount Lemmon || Mount Lemmon Survey ||  || align=right | 1.8 km || 
|-id=283 bgcolor=#fefefe
| 549283 ||  || — || September 13, 2005 || Kitt Peak || Spacewatch ||  || align=right data-sort-value="0.68" | 680 m || 
|-id=284 bgcolor=#fefefe
| 549284 ||  || — || September 21, 2012 || Kitt Peak || Spacewatch ||  || align=right data-sort-value="0.78" | 780 m || 
|-id=285 bgcolor=#d6d6d6
| 549285 ||  || — || April 15, 1996 || Kitt Peak || Spacewatch ||  || align=right | 2.8 km || 
|-id=286 bgcolor=#d6d6d6
| 549286 ||  || — || November 28, 2014 || Haleakala || Pan-STARRS ||  || align=right | 2.8 km || 
|-id=287 bgcolor=#fefefe
| 549287 ||  || — || September 30, 2009 || Mount Lemmon || Mount Lemmon Survey ||  || align=right data-sort-value="0.68" | 680 m || 
|-id=288 bgcolor=#d6d6d6
| 549288 ||  || — || September 20, 2003 || Kitt Peak || Spacewatch ||  || align=right | 3.1 km || 
|-id=289 bgcolor=#fefefe
| 549289 ||  || — || April 2, 2011 || Mount Lemmon || Mount Lemmon Survey ||  || align=right data-sort-value="0.78" | 780 m || 
|-id=290 bgcolor=#fefefe
| 549290 ||  || — || October 24, 2009 || Kitt Peak || Spacewatch ||  || align=right data-sort-value="0.71" | 710 m || 
|-id=291 bgcolor=#d6d6d6
| 549291 ||  || — || August 26, 2003 || Cerro Tololo || Cerro Tololo Obs. ||  || align=right | 2.0 km || 
|-id=292 bgcolor=#fefefe
| 549292 ||  || — || September 30, 2009 || Mount Lemmon || Mount Lemmon Survey ||  || align=right data-sort-value="0.68" | 680 m || 
|-id=293 bgcolor=#d6d6d6
| 549293 ||  || — || July 14, 2013 || Haleakala || Pan-STARRS ||  || align=right | 2.3 km || 
|-id=294 bgcolor=#fefefe
| 549294 ||  || — || November 8, 2009 || Mount Lemmon || Mount Lemmon Survey ||  || align=right data-sort-value="0.78" | 780 m || 
|-id=295 bgcolor=#fefefe
| 549295 ||  || — || November 9, 2009 || Kitt Peak || Spacewatch ||  || align=right data-sort-value="0.82" | 820 m || 
|-id=296 bgcolor=#d6d6d6
| 549296 ||  || — || March 28, 2011 || Mount Lemmon || Mount Lemmon Survey ||  || align=right | 2.3 km || 
|-id=297 bgcolor=#d6d6d6
| 549297 ||  || — || December 11, 2004 || Kitt Peak || Spacewatch ||  || align=right | 2.8 km || 
|-id=298 bgcolor=#d6d6d6
| 549298 ||  || — || December 1, 2005 || Kitt Peak || L. H. Wasserman, R. Millis ||  || align=right | 2.9 km || 
|-id=299 bgcolor=#fefefe
| 549299 ||  || — || February 8, 2011 || Mount Lemmon || Mount Lemmon Survey ||  || align=right data-sort-value="0.78" | 780 m || 
|-id=300 bgcolor=#d6d6d6
| 549300 ||  || — || March 29, 2011 || Catalina || CSS ||  || align=right | 2.2 km || 
|}

549301–549400 

|-bgcolor=#fefefe
| 549301 ||  || — || February 14, 2004 || Kitt Peak || Spacewatch ||  || align=right data-sort-value="0.78" | 780 m || 
|-id=302 bgcolor=#d6d6d6
| 549302 ||  || — || September 24, 2003 || Palomar || NEAT || EOS || align=right | 3.2 km || 
|-id=303 bgcolor=#fefefe
| 549303 ||  || — || March 26, 2011 || Kitt Peak || Spacewatch ||  || align=right data-sort-value="0.90" | 900 m || 
|-id=304 bgcolor=#fefefe
| 549304 ||  || — || June 2, 2016 || Haleakala || Pan-STARRS ||  || align=right | 1.1 km || 
|-id=305 bgcolor=#d6d6d6
| 549305 ||  || — || March 27, 2011 || Kitt Peak || Spacewatch ||  || align=right | 2.4 km || 
|-id=306 bgcolor=#d6d6d6
| 549306 ||  || — || March 27, 2011 || Mount Lemmon || Mount Lemmon Survey ||  || align=right | 2.3 km || 
|-id=307 bgcolor=#d6d6d6
| 549307 ||  || — || March 25, 2011 || Kitt Peak || Spacewatch ||  || align=right | 2.7 km || 
|-id=308 bgcolor=#E9E9E9
| 549308 ||  || — || February 11, 2015 || Mount Lemmon || Mount Lemmon Survey ||  || align=right | 1.0 km || 
|-id=309 bgcolor=#d6d6d6
| 549309 ||  || — || March 30, 2011 || Bergisch Gladbach || W. Bickel ||  || align=right | 2.4 km || 
|-id=310 bgcolor=#fefefe
| 549310 ||  || — || April 1, 2011 || Kitt Peak || Spacewatch ||  || align=right data-sort-value="0.89" | 890 m || 
|-id=311 bgcolor=#d6d6d6
| 549311 ||  || — || May 12, 1996 || Kitt Peak || Spacewatch ||  || align=right | 2.9 km || 
|-id=312 bgcolor=#fefefe
| 549312 ||  || — || April 2, 2011 || Mount Lemmon || Mount Lemmon Survey ||  || align=right data-sort-value="0.75" | 750 m || 
|-id=313 bgcolor=#d6d6d6
| 549313 ||  || — || October 23, 2003 || Kitt Peak || Spacewatch ||  || align=right | 2.7 km || 
|-id=314 bgcolor=#fefefe
| 549314 ||  || — || August 18, 2009 || Kitt Peak || Spacewatch ||  || align=right data-sort-value="0.65" | 650 m || 
|-id=315 bgcolor=#fefefe
| 549315 ||  || — || November 18, 2006 || Kitt Peak || Spacewatch ||  || align=right data-sort-value="0.62" | 620 m || 
|-id=316 bgcolor=#d6d6d6
| 549316 ||  || — || May 4, 2006 || Mount Lemmon || Mount Lemmon Survey ||  || align=right | 2.4 km || 
|-id=317 bgcolor=#fefefe
| 549317 ||  || — || October 10, 2005 || Anderson Mesa || LONEOS ||  || align=right data-sort-value="0.79" | 790 m || 
|-id=318 bgcolor=#d6d6d6
| 549318 ||  || — || October 9, 2008 || Mount Lemmon || Mount Lemmon Survey ||  || align=right | 2.9 km || 
|-id=319 bgcolor=#fefefe
| 549319 ||  || — || March 11, 1996 || Kitt Peak || Spacewatch ||  || align=right data-sort-value="0.98" | 980 m || 
|-id=320 bgcolor=#d6d6d6
| 549320 ||  || — || April 2, 2011 || Mount Lemmon || Mount Lemmon Survey ||  || align=right | 2.3 km || 
|-id=321 bgcolor=#d6d6d6
| 549321 ||  || — || April 2, 2011 || Mount Lemmon || Mount Lemmon Survey ||  || align=right | 2.0 km || 
|-id=322 bgcolor=#d6d6d6
| 549322 ||  || — || March 11, 2011 || Mount Lemmon || Mount Lemmon Survey ||  || align=right | 3.2 km || 
|-id=323 bgcolor=#d6d6d6
| 549323 ||  || — || April 4, 2011 || Mount Lemmon || Mount Lemmon Survey ||  || align=right | 2.7 km || 
|-id=324 bgcolor=#fefefe
| 549324 ||  || — || February 12, 2004 || Kitt Peak || Spacewatch ||  || align=right data-sort-value="0.65" | 650 m || 
|-id=325 bgcolor=#d6d6d6
| 549325 ||  || — || April 4, 2011 || Mount Lemmon || Mount Lemmon Survey ||  || align=right | 3.9 km || 
|-id=326 bgcolor=#fefefe
| 549326 ||  || — || October 22, 2009 || Mount Lemmon || Mount Lemmon Survey ||  || align=right data-sort-value="0.68" | 680 m || 
|-id=327 bgcolor=#fefefe
| 549327 ||  || — || April 4, 2011 || Mount Lemmon || Mount Lemmon Survey ||  || align=right data-sort-value="0.90" | 900 m || 
|-id=328 bgcolor=#FFC2E0
| 549328 ||  || — || April 4, 2011 || Mount Lemmon || Mount Lemmon Survey || APO || align=right data-sort-value="0.56" | 560 m || 
|-id=329 bgcolor=#d6d6d6
| 549329 ||  || — || October 1, 2008 || Kitt Peak || Spacewatch ||  || align=right | 3.1 km || 
|-id=330 bgcolor=#fefefe
| 549330 ||  || — || April 1, 2011 || Kitt Peak || Spacewatch ||  || align=right data-sort-value="0.75" | 750 m || 
|-id=331 bgcolor=#d6d6d6
| 549331 ||  || — || September 5, 2008 || Kitt Peak || Spacewatch ||  || align=right | 2.3 km || 
|-id=332 bgcolor=#d6d6d6
| 549332 ||  || — || April 4, 2011 || Mount Lemmon || Mount Lemmon Survey ||  || align=right | 2.5 km || 
|-id=333 bgcolor=#fefefe
| 549333 ||  || — || March 27, 2011 || Mount Lemmon || Mount Lemmon Survey ||  || align=right data-sort-value="0.86" | 860 m || 
|-id=334 bgcolor=#d6d6d6
| 549334 ||  || — || June 14, 2007 || Kitt Peak || Spacewatch ||  || align=right | 3.5 km || 
|-id=335 bgcolor=#d6d6d6
| 549335 ||  || — || April 4, 2011 || Mount Lemmon || Mount Lemmon Survey ||  || align=right | 2.8 km || 
|-id=336 bgcolor=#fefefe
| 549336 ||  || — || November 17, 2009 || Mount Lemmon || Mount Lemmon Survey ||  || align=right data-sort-value="0.90" | 900 m || 
|-id=337 bgcolor=#fefefe
| 549337 ||  || — || October 4, 1996 || Kitt Peak || Spacewatch || H || align=right data-sort-value="0.78" | 780 m || 
|-id=338 bgcolor=#d6d6d6
| 549338 ||  || — || October 27, 2008 || Mount Lemmon || Mount Lemmon Survey ||  || align=right | 2.4 km || 
|-id=339 bgcolor=#d6d6d6
| 549339 ||  || — || February 25, 2006 || Kitt Peak || Spacewatch ||  || align=right | 2.3 km || 
|-id=340 bgcolor=#d6d6d6
| 549340 ||  || — || September 3, 2008 || Kitt Peak || Spacewatch ||  || align=right | 2.5 km || 
|-id=341 bgcolor=#d6d6d6
| 549341 ||  || — || September 7, 2008 || Mount Lemmon || Mount Lemmon Survey ||  || align=right | 2.1 km || 
|-id=342 bgcolor=#d6d6d6
| 549342 ||  || — || April 6, 2011 || Mount Lemmon || Mount Lemmon Survey ||  || align=right | 2.7 km || 
|-id=343 bgcolor=#d6d6d6
| 549343 ||  || — || March 17, 2005 || Mount Lemmon || Mount Lemmon Survey ||  || align=right | 2.9 km || 
|-id=344 bgcolor=#d6d6d6
| 549344 ||  || — || November 20, 2003 || Kitt Peak || Spacewatch ||  || align=right | 3.4 km || 
|-id=345 bgcolor=#FA8072
| 549345 ||  || — || June 16, 2001 || Palomar || NEAT ||  || align=right data-sort-value="0.75" | 750 m || 
|-id=346 bgcolor=#fefefe
| 549346 ||  || — || March 25, 2011 || Kitt Peak || Spacewatch || H || align=right data-sort-value="0.47" | 470 m || 
|-id=347 bgcolor=#E9E9E9
| 549347 ||  || — || April 11, 2011 || Mount Lemmon || Mount Lemmon Survey ||  || align=right data-sort-value="0.78" | 780 m || 
|-id=348 bgcolor=#fefefe
| 549348 ||  || — || November 8, 2009 || Mount Lemmon || Mount Lemmon Survey ||  || align=right data-sort-value="0.71" | 710 m || 
|-id=349 bgcolor=#d6d6d6
| 549349 ||  || — || April 14, 2011 || Mount Lemmon || Mount Lemmon Survey ||  || align=right | 3.7 km || 
|-id=350 bgcolor=#fefefe
| 549350 ||  || — || April 15, 2011 || Haleakala || Pan-STARRS ||  || align=right data-sort-value="0.65" | 650 m || 
|-id=351 bgcolor=#d6d6d6
| 549351 ||  || — || July 18, 2001 || Palomar || NEAT ||  || align=right | 3.9 km || 
|-id=352 bgcolor=#d6d6d6
| 549352 ||  || — || April 6, 2011 || Kitt Peak || Spacewatch ||  || align=right | 1.6 km || 
|-id=353 bgcolor=#fefefe
| 549353 ||  || — || December 23, 2006 || Vallemare Borbona || V. S. Casulli || V || align=right data-sort-value="0.71" | 710 m || 
|-id=354 bgcolor=#fefefe
| 549354 ||  || — || March 26, 2011 || Mount Lemmon || Mount Lemmon Survey ||  || align=right data-sort-value="0.71" | 710 m || 
|-id=355 bgcolor=#d6d6d6
| 549355 ||  || — || March 27, 2011 || Mount Lemmon || Mount Lemmon Survey ||  || align=right | 2.8 km || 
|-id=356 bgcolor=#d6d6d6
| 549356 ||  || — || December 2, 2005 || Mauna Kea || Mauna Kea Obs. ||  || align=right | 2.2 km || 
|-id=357 bgcolor=#fefefe
| 549357 ||  || — || September 14, 2005 || Catalina || CSS ||  || align=right | 1.3 km || 
|-id=358 bgcolor=#fefefe
| 549358 ||  || — || April 1, 2011 || Kitt Peak || Spacewatch ||  || align=right data-sort-value="0.59" | 590 m || 
|-id=359 bgcolor=#fefefe
| 549359 ||  || — || April 1, 2011 || Kitt Peak || Spacewatch ||  || align=right data-sort-value="0.82" | 820 m || 
|-id=360 bgcolor=#fefefe
| 549360 ||  || — || April 12, 2011 || Mount Lemmon || Mount Lemmon Survey ||  || align=right data-sort-value="0.90" | 900 m || 
|-id=361 bgcolor=#d6d6d6
| 549361 ||  || — || April 5, 2011 || Mount Lemmon || Mount Lemmon Survey ||  || align=right | 3.2 km || 
|-id=362 bgcolor=#fefefe
| 549362 ||  || — || April 2, 2011 || Mount Lemmon || Mount Lemmon Survey || H || align=right data-sort-value="0.57" | 570 m || 
|-id=363 bgcolor=#fefefe
| 549363 ||  || — || January 10, 2014 || Mount Lemmon || Mount Lemmon Survey ||  || align=right data-sort-value="0.71" | 710 m || 
|-id=364 bgcolor=#fefefe
| 549364 ||  || — || April 3, 2011 || Haleakala || Pan-STARRS ||  || align=right data-sort-value="0.78" | 780 m || 
|-id=365 bgcolor=#fefefe
| 549365 ||  || — || February 6, 2014 || Mount Lemmon || Mount Lemmon Survey ||  || align=right data-sort-value="0.71" | 710 m || 
|-id=366 bgcolor=#d6d6d6
| 549366 ||  || — || April 13, 2011 || Haleakala || Pan-STARRS ||  || align=right | 3.5 km || 
|-id=367 bgcolor=#d6d6d6
| 549367 ||  || — || January 27, 2015 || Haleakala || Pan-STARRS ||  || align=right | 2.8 km || 
|-id=368 bgcolor=#d6d6d6
| 549368 ||  || — || April 6, 2011 || Mount Lemmon || Mount Lemmon Survey ||  || align=right | 2.5 km || 
|-id=369 bgcolor=#d6d6d6
| 549369 ||  || — || April 6, 2011 || Mount Lemmon || Mount Lemmon Survey || 3:2 || align=right | 3.1 km || 
|-id=370 bgcolor=#d6d6d6
| 549370 ||  || — || April 3, 2011 || Haleakala || Pan-STARRS ||  || align=right | 2.1 km || 
|-id=371 bgcolor=#d6d6d6
| 549371 ||  || — || April 1, 2011 || Mount Lemmon || Mount Lemmon Survey ||  || align=right | 2.9 km || 
|-id=372 bgcolor=#d6d6d6
| 549372 ||  || — || April 5, 2011 || Kitt Peak || Spacewatch ||  || align=right | 2.4 km || 
|-id=373 bgcolor=#d6d6d6
| 549373 ||  || — || April 5, 2011 || Kitt Peak || Spacewatch ||  || align=right | 2.9 km || 
|-id=374 bgcolor=#d6d6d6
| 549374 ||  || — || April 12, 2011 || Mount Lemmon || Mount Lemmon Survey ||  || align=right | 3.1 km || 
|-id=375 bgcolor=#E9E9E9
| 549375 ||  || — || April 6, 2011 || Kitt Peak || Spacewatch ||  || align=right | 1.2 km || 
|-id=376 bgcolor=#E9E9E9
| 549376 ||  || — || April 1, 2011 || Kitt Peak || Spacewatch ||  || align=right data-sort-value="0.78" | 780 m || 
|-id=377 bgcolor=#d6d6d6
| 549377 ||  || — || April 1, 2011 || Kitt Peak || Spacewatch ||  || align=right | 2.5 km || 
|-id=378 bgcolor=#fefefe
| 549378 ||  || — || April 3, 2011 || Haleakala || Pan-STARRS ||  || align=right data-sort-value="0.65" | 650 m || 
|-id=379 bgcolor=#fefefe
| 549379 ||  || — || April 22, 2011 || Andrushivka || P. Kyrylenko, Y. Ivaščenko || H || align=right data-sort-value="0.54" | 540 m || 
|-id=380 bgcolor=#fefefe
| 549380 ||  || — || April 24, 2011 || Haleakala || Pan-STARRS || H || align=right data-sort-value="0.54" | 540 m || 
|-id=381 bgcolor=#d6d6d6
| 549381 ||  || — || May 24, 2001 || Apache Point || SDSS Collaboration ||  || align=right | 2.4 km || 
|-id=382 bgcolor=#fefefe
| 549382 ||  || — || April 25, 2011 || Nogales || Tenagra II Obs. || H || align=right data-sort-value="0.75" | 750 m || 
|-id=383 bgcolor=#fefefe
| 549383 ||  || — || December 13, 2006 || Kitt Peak || Spacewatch ||  || align=right data-sort-value="0.71" | 710 m || 
|-id=384 bgcolor=#d6d6d6
| 549384 ||  || — || April 23, 2011 || Haleakala || Pan-STARRS ||  || align=right | 2.9 km || 
|-id=385 bgcolor=#d6d6d6
| 549385 ||  || — || April 24, 2011 || Mount Lemmon || Mount Lemmon Survey ||  || align=right | 2.5 km || 
|-id=386 bgcolor=#d6d6d6
| 549386 ||  || — || October 15, 2007 || Mount Lemmon || Mount Lemmon Survey ||  || align=right | 2.9 km || 
|-id=387 bgcolor=#d6d6d6
| 549387 ||  || — || April 25, 2011 || Mount Lemmon || Mount Lemmon Survey ||  || align=right | 3.2 km || 
|-id=388 bgcolor=#fefefe
| 549388 ||  || — || April 3, 2011 || Haleakala || Pan-STARRS ||  || align=right data-sort-value="0.78" | 780 m || 
|-id=389 bgcolor=#d6d6d6
| 549389 ||  || — || November 20, 2008 || Kitt Peak || Spacewatch ||  || align=right | 3.4 km || 
|-id=390 bgcolor=#d6d6d6
| 549390 ||  || — || March 13, 2005 || Kitt Peak || Spacewatch ||  || align=right | 3.4 km || 
|-id=391 bgcolor=#d6d6d6
| 549391 ||  || — || October 26, 2008 || Mount Lemmon || Mount Lemmon Survey ||  || align=right | 4.4 km || 
|-id=392 bgcolor=#fefefe
| 549392 ||  || — || February 16, 2004 || Kitt Peak || Spacewatch ||  || align=right data-sort-value="0.79" | 790 m || 
|-id=393 bgcolor=#d6d6d6
| 549393 ||  || — || July 20, 2001 || Palomar || NEAT ||  || align=right | 3.5 km || 
|-id=394 bgcolor=#d6d6d6
| 549394 ||  || — || July 19, 2001 || Palomar || NEAT ||  || align=right | 4.0 km || 
|-id=395 bgcolor=#fefefe
| 549395 ||  || — || March 26, 2011 || Kitt Peak || Spacewatch ||  || align=right data-sort-value="0.67" | 670 m || 
|-id=396 bgcolor=#fefefe
| 549396 ||  || — || April 6, 2011 || Mount Lemmon || Mount Lemmon Survey ||  || align=right data-sort-value="0.65" | 650 m || 
|-id=397 bgcolor=#d6d6d6
| 549397 ||  || — || April 22, 2011 || Kitt Peak || Spacewatch ||  || align=right | 2.7 km || 
|-id=398 bgcolor=#fefefe
| 549398 ||  || — || April 6, 2011 || Mount Lemmon || Mount Lemmon Survey ||  || align=right data-sort-value="0.78" | 780 m || 
|-id=399 bgcolor=#d6d6d6
| 549399 ||  || — || November 15, 2009 || Mount Lemmon || Mount Lemmon Survey || EOS || align=right | 2.7 km || 
|-id=400 bgcolor=#fefefe
| 549400 ||  || — || April 24, 2011 || Kitt Peak || Spacewatch || H || align=right data-sort-value="0.54" | 540 m || 
|}

549401–549500 

|-bgcolor=#d6d6d6
| 549401 ||  || — || April 26, 2011 || Mount Lemmon || Mount Lemmon Survey ||  || align=right | 2.1 km || 
|-id=402 bgcolor=#d6d6d6
| 549402 ||  || — || October 26, 2008 || Mount Lemmon || Mount Lemmon Survey || EOS || align=right | 2.1 km || 
|-id=403 bgcolor=#d6d6d6
| 549403 ||  || — || April 24, 2006 || Kitt Peak || Spacewatch ||  || align=right | 2.7 km || 
|-id=404 bgcolor=#d6d6d6
| 549404 ||  || — || April 27, 2011 || Mount Lemmon || Mount Lemmon Survey ||  || align=right | 2.4 km || 
|-id=405 bgcolor=#fefefe
| 549405 ||  || — || April 6, 2011 || Mount Lemmon || Mount Lemmon Survey ||  || align=right data-sort-value="0.71" | 710 m || 
|-id=406 bgcolor=#fefefe
| 549406 ||  || — || April 27, 2011 || Mount Lemmon || Mount Lemmon Survey ||  || align=right data-sort-value="0.82" | 820 m || 
|-id=407 bgcolor=#d6d6d6
| 549407 ||  || — || April 27, 2011 || Haleakala || Pan-STARRS ||  || align=right | 2.8 km || 
|-id=408 bgcolor=#d6d6d6
| 549408 ||  || — || November 1, 2008 || Mount Lemmon || Mount Lemmon Survey ||  || align=right | 2.7 km || 
|-id=409 bgcolor=#d6d6d6
| 549409 ||  || — || November 20, 2003 || Apache Point || SDSS Collaboration ||  || align=right | 2.8 km || 
|-id=410 bgcolor=#fefefe
| 549410 ||  || — || April 5, 2011 || Kitt Peak || Spacewatch ||  || align=right data-sort-value="0.59" | 590 m || 
|-id=411 bgcolor=#fefefe
| 549411 ||  || — || April 28, 2011 || Haleakala || Pan-STARRS ||  || align=right data-sort-value="0.82" | 820 m || 
|-id=412 bgcolor=#d6d6d6
| 549412 ||  || — || April 30, 2011 || Kitt Peak || Spacewatch ||  || align=right | 3.5 km || 
|-id=413 bgcolor=#d6d6d6
| 549413 ||  || — || April 22, 2011 || Kitt Peak || Spacewatch ||  || align=right | 3.2 km || 
|-id=414 bgcolor=#d6d6d6
| 549414 ||  || — || October 31, 2002 || Apache Point || SDSS Collaboration ||  || align=right | 3.5 km || 
|-id=415 bgcolor=#fefefe
| 549415 ||  || — || August 24, 2001 || Haleakala || AMOS ||  || align=right data-sort-value="0.86" | 860 m || 
|-id=416 bgcolor=#d6d6d6
| 549416 ||  || — || April 12, 2011 || Mount Lemmon || Mount Lemmon Survey ||  || align=right | 3.7 km || 
|-id=417 bgcolor=#d6d6d6
| 549417 ||  || — || April 6, 2011 || Mount Lemmon || Mount Lemmon Survey ||  || align=right | 2.0 km || 
|-id=418 bgcolor=#fefefe
| 549418 ||  || — || September 23, 2009 || Zelenchukskaya Stn || T. V. Kryachko, B. Satovski || H || align=right data-sort-value="0.54" | 540 m || 
|-id=419 bgcolor=#d6d6d6
| 549419 ||  || — || July 24, 2001 || Palomar || NEAT ||  || align=right | 4.4 km || 
|-id=420 bgcolor=#E9E9E9
| 549420 ||  || — || November 7, 2005 || Mauna Kea || Mauna Kea Obs. ||  || align=right | 1.8 km || 
|-id=421 bgcolor=#fefefe
| 549421 ||  || — || April 26, 2011 || Kitt Peak || Spacewatch ||  || align=right data-sort-value="0.86" | 860 m || 
|-id=422 bgcolor=#d6d6d6
| 549422 ||  || — || April 22, 2011 || Kitt Peak || Spacewatch ||  || align=right | 3.5 km || 
|-id=423 bgcolor=#d6d6d6
| 549423 ||  || — || April 27, 2011 || Kitt Peak || Spacewatch ||  || align=right | 2.3 km || 
|-id=424 bgcolor=#fefefe
| 549424 ||  || — || April 4, 2011 || Kitt Peak || Spacewatch ||  || align=right | 1.1 km || 
|-id=425 bgcolor=#fefefe
| 549425 ||  || — || June 26, 2001 || Kitt Peak || Spacewatch ||  || align=right data-sort-value="0.65" | 650 m || 
|-id=426 bgcolor=#d6d6d6
| 549426 ||  || — || April 2, 2011 || Kitt Peak || Spacewatch ||  || align=right | 2.2 km || 
|-id=427 bgcolor=#d6d6d6
| 549427 ||  || — || December 3, 2002 || Palomar || NEAT || VER || align=right | 3.6 km || 
|-id=428 bgcolor=#fefefe
| 549428 ||  || — || April 23, 2011 || Kitt Peak || Spacewatch || H || align=right data-sort-value="0.62" | 620 m || 
|-id=429 bgcolor=#fefefe
| 549429 ||  || — || January 24, 2007 || Bergisch Gladbach || W. Bickel ||  || align=right data-sort-value="0.98" | 980 m || 
|-id=430 bgcolor=#d6d6d6
| 549430 ||  || — || April 6, 2011 || Mount Lemmon || Mount Lemmon Survey ||  || align=right | 2.4 km || 
|-id=431 bgcolor=#d6d6d6
| 549431 ||  || — || April 26, 2011 || Mount Lemmon || Mount Lemmon Survey ||  || align=right | 2.5 km || 
|-id=432 bgcolor=#d6d6d6
| 549432 ||  || — || January 17, 2009 || Mount Lemmon || Mount Lemmon Survey || 3:2 || align=right | 4.4 km || 
|-id=433 bgcolor=#d6d6d6
| 549433 ||  || — || March 29, 2011 || Kitt Peak || Spacewatch ||  || align=right | 2.5 km || 
|-id=434 bgcolor=#d6d6d6
| 549434 ||  || — || June 17, 2006 || Kitt Peak || Spacewatch ||  || align=right | 3.2 km || 
|-id=435 bgcolor=#fefefe
| 549435 ||  || — || September 25, 2009 || Kitt Peak || Spacewatch ||  || align=right data-sort-value="0.68" | 680 m || 
|-id=436 bgcolor=#fefefe
| 549436 ||  || — || November 6, 2005 || Mount Lemmon || Mount Lemmon Survey ||  || align=right data-sort-value="0.78" | 780 m || 
|-id=437 bgcolor=#fefefe
| 549437 ||  || — || April 27, 2011 || Haleakala || Pan-STARRS ||  || align=right data-sort-value="0.59" | 590 m || 
|-id=438 bgcolor=#fefefe
| 549438 ||  || — || April 12, 2011 || Kitt Peak || Spacewatch ||  || align=right data-sort-value="0.57" | 570 m || 
|-id=439 bgcolor=#fefefe
| 549439 ||  || — || April 13, 2011 || Mount Lemmon || Mount Lemmon Survey || V || align=right data-sort-value="0.59" | 590 m || 
|-id=440 bgcolor=#d6d6d6
| 549440 ||  || — || April 28, 2011 || Kitt Peak || Spacewatch ||  || align=right | 2.8 km || 
|-id=441 bgcolor=#d6d6d6
| 549441 ||  || — || April 2, 2006 || Kitt Peak || Spacewatch ||  || align=right | 2.3 km || 
|-id=442 bgcolor=#d6d6d6
| 549442 ||  || — || April 30, 2011 || Haleakala || Pan-STARRS ||  || align=right | 3.2 km || 
|-id=443 bgcolor=#fefefe
| 549443 ||  || — || April 22, 2011 || Kitt Peak || Spacewatch ||  || align=right data-sort-value="0.68" | 680 m || 
|-id=444 bgcolor=#d6d6d6
| 549444 ||  || — || April 11, 2005 || Mount Lemmon || Mount Lemmon Survey ||  || align=right | 2.8 km || 
|-id=445 bgcolor=#d6d6d6
| 549445 ||  || — || February 5, 2016 || Haleakala || Pan-STARRS ||  || align=right | 2.9 km || 
|-id=446 bgcolor=#fefefe
| 549446 ||  || — || April 30, 2011 || Haleakala || Pan-STARRS ||  || align=right data-sort-value="0.68" | 680 m || 
|-id=447 bgcolor=#fefefe
| 549447 ||  || — || December 12, 2012 || Mount Lemmon || Mount Lemmon Survey || H || align=right data-sort-value="0.78" | 780 m || 
|-id=448 bgcolor=#fefefe
| 549448 ||  || — || January 25, 2014 || Haleakala || Pan-STARRS ||  || align=right data-sort-value="0.82" | 820 m || 
|-id=449 bgcolor=#d6d6d6
| 549449 ||  || — || April 28, 2011 || Kitt Peak || Spacewatch ||  || align=right | 2.9 km || 
|-id=450 bgcolor=#d6d6d6
| 549450 ||  || — || April 27, 2011 || Mount Lemmon || Mount Lemmon Survey ||  || align=right | 2.9 km || 
|-id=451 bgcolor=#d6d6d6
| 549451 ||  || — || September 12, 2013 || Catalina || CSS ||  || align=right | 3.9 km || 
|-id=452 bgcolor=#fefefe
| 549452 ||  || — || October 8, 2012 || Mount Lemmon || Mount Lemmon Survey ||  || align=right data-sort-value="0.86" | 860 m || 
|-id=453 bgcolor=#fefefe
| 549453 ||  || — || November 20, 2016 || Mount Lemmon || Mount Lemmon Survey ||  || align=right | 1.0 km || 
|-id=454 bgcolor=#d6d6d6
| 549454 ||  || — || September 14, 2013 || Haleakala || Pan-STARRS ||  || align=right | 2.9 km || 
|-id=455 bgcolor=#d6d6d6
| 549455 ||  || — || April 29, 2011 || Mount Lemmon || Mount Lemmon Survey ||  || align=right | 2.9 km || 
|-id=456 bgcolor=#d6d6d6
| 549456 ||  || — || October 25, 2013 || Mount Lemmon || Mount Lemmon Survey ||  || align=right | 2.5 km || 
|-id=457 bgcolor=#d6d6d6
| 549457 ||  || — || November 4, 2013 || Haleakala || Pan-STARRS ||  || align=right | 3.1 km || 
|-id=458 bgcolor=#fefefe
| 549458 ||  || — || April 30, 2011 || Mount Lemmon || Mount Lemmon Survey ||  || align=right data-sort-value="0.65" | 650 m || 
|-id=459 bgcolor=#FFC2E0
| 549459 ||  || — || May 2, 2011 || Catalina || CSS || APO +1km || align=right data-sort-value="0.86" | 860 m || 
|-id=460 bgcolor=#fefefe
| 549460 ||  || — || April 26, 2011 || Kitt Peak || Spacewatch ||  || align=right data-sort-value="0.98" | 980 m || 
|-id=461 bgcolor=#d6d6d6
| 549461 ||  || — || May 1, 2011 || Haleakala || Pan-STARRS ||  || align=right | 3.4 km || 
|-id=462 bgcolor=#d6d6d6
| 549462 ||  || — || September 27, 2006 || Kitt Peak || Spacewatch ||  || align=right | 3.4 km || 
|-id=463 bgcolor=#fefefe
| 549463 ||  || — || March 25, 2011 || Kitt Peak || Spacewatch ||  || align=right data-sort-value="0.82" | 820 m || 
|-id=464 bgcolor=#d6d6d6
| 549464 ||  || — || January 1, 2003 || La Silla || La Silla Obs. ||  || align=right | 3.5 km || 
|-id=465 bgcolor=#d6d6d6
| 549465 ||  || — || November 18, 2007 || Mount Lemmon || Mount Lemmon Survey ||  || align=right | 3.2 km || 
|-id=466 bgcolor=#d6d6d6
| 549466 ||  || — || February 15, 2010 || Mount Lemmon || Mount Lemmon Survey ||  || align=right | 2.8 km || 
|-id=467 bgcolor=#d6d6d6
| 549467 ||  || — || March 12, 2010 || Kitt Peak || Spacewatch ||  || align=right | 3.4 km || 
|-id=468 bgcolor=#d6d6d6
| 549468 ||  || — || May 1, 2011 || Haleakala || Pan-STARRS ||  || align=right | 2.7 km || 
|-id=469 bgcolor=#fefefe
| 549469 ||  || — || March 27, 2011 || Kitt Peak || Spacewatch ||  || align=right data-sort-value="0.68" | 680 m || 
|-id=470 bgcolor=#d6d6d6
| 549470 ||  || — || May 3, 2011 || Kitt Peak || Spacewatch ||  || align=right | 3.1 km || 
|-id=471 bgcolor=#d6d6d6
| 549471 ||  || — || May 1, 2011 || Haleakala || Pan-STARRS ||  || align=right | 2.8 km || 
|-id=472 bgcolor=#d6d6d6
| 549472 ||  || — || April 2, 2005 || Mount Lemmon || Mount Lemmon Survey ||  || align=right | 3.1 km || 
|-id=473 bgcolor=#d6d6d6
| 549473 ||  || — || May 1, 2011 || Haleakala || Pan-STARRS ||  || align=right | 3.0 km || 
|-id=474 bgcolor=#d6d6d6
| 549474 ||  || — || February 16, 2010 || Kitt Peak || Spacewatch ||  || align=right | 2.9 km || 
|-id=475 bgcolor=#E9E9E9
| 549475 ||  || — || May 13, 2011 || Nogales || M. Schwartz, P. R. Holvorcem ||  || align=right | 1.5 km || 
|-id=476 bgcolor=#d6d6d6
| 549476 ||  || — || September 13, 2007 || Mount Lemmon || Mount Lemmon Survey ||  || align=right | 2.5 km || 
|-id=477 bgcolor=#d6d6d6
| 549477 ||  || — || December 3, 2008 || Kitt Peak || Spacewatch ||  || align=right | 2.7 km || 
|-id=478 bgcolor=#d6d6d6
| 549478 ||  || — || May 3, 2011 || Mount Lemmon || Mount Lemmon Survey ||  || align=right | 3.4 km || 
|-id=479 bgcolor=#fefefe
| 549479 ||  || — || January 9, 2014 || Haleakala || Pan-STARRS ||  || align=right data-sort-value="0.71" | 710 m || 
|-id=480 bgcolor=#d6d6d6
| 549480 ||  || — || May 11, 2011 || Kitt Peak || Spacewatch ||  || align=right | 3.4 km || 
|-id=481 bgcolor=#E9E9E9
| 549481 ||  || — || October 20, 2012 || Catalina || CSS ||  || align=right | 1.6 km || 
|-id=482 bgcolor=#d6d6d6
| 549482 ||  || — || August 25, 2012 || Haleakala || Pan-STARRS ||  || align=right | 3.1 km || 
|-id=483 bgcolor=#d6d6d6
| 549483 ||  || — || May 6, 2011 || Kitt Peak || Spacewatch ||  || align=right | 2.9 km || 
|-id=484 bgcolor=#d6d6d6
| 549484 ||  || — || May 13, 2011 || Mount Lemmon || Mount Lemmon Survey ||  || align=right | 2.7 km || 
|-id=485 bgcolor=#d6d6d6
| 549485 ||  || — || November 20, 2008 || Kitt Peak || Spacewatch ||  || align=right | 3.1 km || 
|-id=486 bgcolor=#d6d6d6
| 549486 ||  || — || May 21, 2011 || Haleakala || Pan-STARRS ||  || align=right | 3.7 km || 
|-id=487 bgcolor=#fefefe
| 549487 ||  || — || August 25, 2008 || Hibiscus || N. Teamo, S. F. Hönig ||  || align=right data-sort-value="0.68" | 680 m || 
|-id=488 bgcolor=#E9E9E9
| 549488 ||  || — || May 13, 2011 || Nogales || M. Schwartz, P. R. Holvorcem ||  || align=right | 1.6 km || 
|-id=489 bgcolor=#fefefe
| 549489 ||  || — || October 27, 2005 || Kitt Peak || Spacewatch ||  || align=right data-sort-value="0.75" | 750 m || 
|-id=490 bgcolor=#d6d6d6
| 549490 ||  || — || October 15, 2001 || Palomar || NEAT ||  || align=right | 3.4 km || 
|-id=491 bgcolor=#d6d6d6
| 549491 ||  || — || August 20, 2006 || Palomar || NEAT ||  || align=right | 3.7 km || 
|-id=492 bgcolor=#fefefe
| 549492 ||  || — || October 1, 2008 || Mount Lemmon || Mount Lemmon Survey ||  || align=right data-sort-value="0.94" | 940 m || 
|-id=493 bgcolor=#fefefe
| 549493 ||  || — || January 27, 2007 || Kitt Peak || Spacewatch ||  || align=right data-sort-value="0.78" | 780 m || 
|-id=494 bgcolor=#E9E9E9
| 549494 ||  || — || September 25, 2003 || Palomar || NEAT ||  || align=right | 1.5 km || 
|-id=495 bgcolor=#fefefe
| 549495 ||  || — || January 17, 2007 || Palomar || NEAT ||  || align=right data-sort-value="0.82" | 820 m || 
|-id=496 bgcolor=#E9E9E9
| 549496 ||  || — || March 12, 2002 || Kitt Peak || Spacewatch ||  || align=right | 1.3 km || 
|-id=497 bgcolor=#d6d6d6
| 549497 ||  || — || February 1, 2005 || Catalina || CSS ||  || align=right | 4.0 km || 
|-id=498 bgcolor=#fefefe
| 549498 ||  || — || May 27, 2011 || Nogales || M. Schwartz, P. R. Holvorcem || H || align=right data-sort-value="0.61" | 610 m || 
|-id=499 bgcolor=#fefefe
| 549499 ||  || — || May 30, 2011 || Haleakala || Pan-STARRS || H || align=right data-sort-value="0.57" | 570 m || 
|-id=500 bgcolor=#fefefe
| 549500 ||  || — || January 17, 2007 || Kitt Peak || Spacewatch ||  || align=right data-sort-value="0.75" | 750 m || 
|}

549501–549600 

|-bgcolor=#fefefe
| 549501 ||  || — || April 5, 2011 || Mount Lemmon || Mount Lemmon Survey ||  || align=right data-sort-value="0.78" | 780 m || 
|-id=502 bgcolor=#fefefe
| 549502 ||  || — || May 22, 2011 || Mount Lemmon || Mount Lemmon Survey ||  || align=right data-sort-value="0.62" | 620 m || 
|-id=503 bgcolor=#d6d6d6
| 549503 ||  || — || April 30, 2000 || Haleakala || AMOS ||  || align=right | 3.2 km || 
|-id=504 bgcolor=#d6d6d6
| 549504 ||  || — || November 29, 2003 || Kitt Peak || Spacewatch ||  || align=right | 3.4 km || 
|-id=505 bgcolor=#fefefe
| 549505 ||  || — || May 22, 2011 || Mount Lemmon || Mount Lemmon Survey ||  || align=right data-sort-value="0.90" | 900 m || 
|-id=506 bgcolor=#d6d6d6
| 549506 ||  || — || April 16, 2005 || Catalina || CSS || TIR || align=right | 3.5 km || 
|-id=507 bgcolor=#E9E9E9
| 549507 ||  || — || April 11, 2002 || Palomar || NEAT ||  || align=right | 1.7 km || 
|-id=508 bgcolor=#d6d6d6
| 549508 ||  || — || January 30, 2011 || Haleakala || Pan-STARRS ||  || align=right | 3.7 km || 
|-id=509 bgcolor=#fefefe
| 549509 ||  || — || May 5, 2011 || Mount Lemmon || Mount Lemmon Survey ||  || align=right | 1.0 km || 
|-id=510 bgcolor=#d6d6d6
| 549510 ||  || — || March 28, 2011 || Kitt Peak || Spacewatch ||  || align=right | 3.1 km || 
|-id=511 bgcolor=#fefefe
| 549511 ||  || — || July 16, 2004 || Siding Spring || SSS ||  || align=right data-sort-value="0.95" | 950 m || 
|-id=512 bgcolor=#d6d6d6
| 549512 ||  || — || March 17, 2005 || Mount Lemmon || Mount Lemmon Survey ||  || align=right | 2.4 km || 
|-id=513 bgcolor=#fefefe
| 549513 ||  || — || May 24, 2011 || Haleakala || Pan-STARRS ||  || align=right data-sort-value="0.86" | 860 m || 
|-id=514 bgcolor=#d6d6d6
| 549514 ||  || — || November 18, 2008 || Kitt Peak || Spacewatch ||  || align=right | 2.9 km || 
|-id=515 bgcolor=#d6d6d6
| 549515 ||  || — || June 19, 2006 || Mount Lemmon || Mount Lemmon Survey ||  || align=right | 3.1 km || 
|-id=516 bgcolor=#d6d6d6
| 549516 ||  || — || March 17, 2005 || Mount Lemmon || Mount Lemmon Survey ||  || align=right | 4.0 km || 
|-id=517 bgcolor=#fefefe
| 549517 ||  || — || December 25, 2006 || Kitt Peak || Spacewatch ||  || align=right data-sort-value="0.82" | 820 m || 
|-id=518 bgcolor=#d6d6d6
| 549518 ||  || — || May 24, 2011 || Haleakala || Pan-STARRS ||  || align=right | 2.7 km || 
|-id=519 bgcolor=#d6d6d6
| 549519 ||  || — || November 2, 2013 || Mount Lemmon || Mount Lemmon Survey ||  || align=right | 3.7 km || 
|-id=520 bgcolor=#d6d6d6
| 549520 ||  || — || May 26, 2011 || Mount Lemmon || Mount Lemmon Survey ||  || align=right | 3.1 km || 
|-id=521 bgcolor=#fefefe
| 549521 ||  || — || August 25, 2012 || Haleakala || Pan-STARRS ||  || align=right data-sort-value="0.94" | 940 m || 
|-id=522 bgcolor=#d6d6d6
| 549522 ||  || — || August 14, 2012 || Haleakala || Pan-STARRS ||  || align=right | 2.8 km || 
|-id=523 bgcolor=#d6d6d6
| 549523 ||  || — || May 25, 2011 || Mount Lemmon || Mount Lemmon Survey ||  || align=right | 2.8 km || 
|-id=524 bgcolor=#d6d6d6
| 549524 ||  || — || October 5, 2013 || Haleakala || Pan-STARRS ||  || align=right | 2.7 km || 
|-id=525 bgcolor=#d6d6d6
| 549525 ||  || — || May 31, 2011 || Mount Lemmon || Mount Lemmon Survey ||  || align=right | 2.9 km || 
|-id=526 bgcolor=#d6d6d6
| 549526 ||  || — || June 4, 2011 || Mount Lemmon || Mount Lemmon Survey ||  || align=right | 2.5 km || 
|-id=527 bgcolor=#d6d6d6
| 549527 ||  || — || June 4, 2011 || Mount Lemmon || Mount Lemmon Survey ||  || align=right | 2.2 km || 
|-id=528 bgcolor=#fefefe
| 549528 ||  || — || June 4, 2011 || Mount Lemmon || Mount Lemmon Survey ||  || align=right data-sort-value="0.75" | 750 m || 
|-id=529 bgcolor=#d6d6d6
| 549529 ||  || — || June 4, 2011 || Kitt Peak || Spacewatch ||  || align=right | 2.4 km || 
|-id=530 bgcolor=#fefefe
| 549530 ||  || — || October 28, 2005 || Kitt Peak || Spacewatch ||  || align=right data-sort-value="0.64" | 640 m || 
|-id=531 bgcolor=#d6d6d6
| 549531 ||  || — || December 31, 2008 || Mount Lemmon || Mount Lemmon Survey ||  || align=right | 4.4 km || 
|-id=532 bgcolor=#E9E9E9
| 549532 ||  || — || June 3, 2011 || Mount Lemmon || Mount Lemmon Survey ||  || align=right | 1.1 km || 
|-id=533 bgcolor=#fefefe
| 549533 ||  || — || June 4, 2011 || Mount Lemmon || Mount Lemmon Survey ||  || align=right data-sort-value="0.86" | 860 m || 
|-id=534 bgcolor=#d6d6d6
| 549534 ||  || — || December 2, 2008 || Kitt Peak || Spacewatch ||  || align=right | 3.4 km || 
|-id=535 bgcolor=#d6d6d6
| 549535 ||  || — || May 21, 2011 || Haleakala || Pan-STARRS ||  || align=right | 3.4 km || 
|-id=536 bgcolor=#d6d6d6
| 549536 ||  || — || May 21, 2011 || Mount Lemmon || Mount Lemmon Survey ||  || align=right | 3.4 km || 
|-id=537 bgcolor=#E9E9E9
| 549537 ||  || — || June 7, 2011 || Mount Lemmon || Mount Lemmon Survey ||  || align=right | 1.3 km || 
|-id=538 bgcolor=#E9E9E9
| 549538 ||  || — || June 3, 2011 || Nogales || M. Schwartz, P. R. Holvorcem ||  || align=right | 1.4 km || 
|-id=539 bgcolor=#d6d6d6
| 549539 ||  || — || May 12, 2011 || Nogales || M. Schwartz, P. R. Holvorcem ||  || align=right | 3.7 km || 
|-id=540 bgcolor=#E9E9E9
| 549540 ||  || — || June 7, 2011 || Haleakala || Pan-STARRS ||  || align=right data-sort-value="0.90" | 900 m || 
|-id=541 bgcolor=#E9E9E9
| 549541 ||  || — || May 23, 2011 || Mount Lemmon || Mount Lemmon Survey ||  || align=right | 1.2 km || 
|-id=542 bgcolor=#fefefe
| 549542 ||  || — || June 8, 2011 || Nogales || M. Schwartz, P. R. Holvorcem || H || align=right data-sort-value="0.51" | 510 m || 
|-id=543 bgcolor=#fefefe
| 549543 ||  || — || July 31, 2006 || Siding Spring || SSS || H || align=right data-sort-value="0.62" | 620 m || 
|-id=544 bgcolor=#E9E9E9
| 549544 ||  || — || May 27, 2011 || Kitt Peak || Spacewatch ||  || align=right | 1.0 km || 
|-id=545 bgcolor=#d6d6d6
| 549545 ||  || — || June 4, 2011 || Mount Lemmon || Mount Lemmon Survey || 3:2 || align=right | 3.1 km || 
|-id=546 bgcolor=#d6d6d6
| 549546 ||  || — || May 28, 2011 || Mount Lemmon || Mount Lemmon Survey ||  || align=right | 3.2 km || 
|-id=547 bgcolor=#d6d6d6
| 549547 ||  || — || November 21, 2008 || Kitt Peak || Spacewatch ||  || align=right | 2.8 km || 
|-id=548 bgcolor=#d6d6d6
| 549548 ||  || — || September 15, 2007 || Kitt Peak || Spacewatch ||  || align=right | 3.1 km || 
|-id=549 bgcolor=#d6d6d6
| 549549 ||  || — || May 22, 2011 || Mount Lemmon || Mount Lemmon Survey ||  || align=right | 2.7 km || 
|-id=550 bgcolor=#d6d6d6
| 549550 ||  || — || December 1, 2008 || Kitt Peak || Spacewatch ||  || align=right | 2.8 km || 
|-id=551 bgcolor=#d6d6d6
| 549551 ||  || — || August 10, 2012 || Kitt Peak || Spacewatch ||  || align=right | 3.1 km || 
|-id=552 bgcolor=#E9E9E9
| 549552 ||  || — || September 17, 1995 || Kitt Peak || Spacewatch ||  || align=right data-sort-value="0.94" | 940 m || 
|-id=553 bgcolor=#E9E9E9
| 549553 ||  || — || March 28, 2015 || Haleakala || Pan-STARRS ||  || align=right data-sort-value="0.98" | 980 m || 
|-id=554 bgcolor=#d6d6d6
| 549554 ||  || — || June 4, 2011 || Mount Lemmon || Mount Lemmon Survey ||  || align=right | 3.2 km || 
|-id=555 bgcolor=#d6d6d6
| 549555 ||  || — || January 23, 2015 || Haleakala || Pan-STARRS ||  || align=right | 3.1 km || 
|-id=556 bgcolor=#fefefe
| 549556 ||  || — || January 9, 2007 || Kitt Peak || Spacewatch ||  || align=right data-sort-value="0.68" | 680 m || 
|-id=557 bgcolor=#E9E9E9
| 549557 ||  || — || October 16, 2012 || Mount Lemmon || Mount Lemmon Survey ||  || align=right data-sort-value="0.75" | 750 m || 
|-id=558 bgcolor=#d6d6d6
| 549558 ||  || — || June 4, 2011 || Mount Lemmon || Mount Lemmon Survey ||  || align=right | 2.6 km || 
|-id=559 bgcolor=#d6d6d6
| 549559 ||  || — || June 4, 2011 || Mount Lemmon || Mount Lemmon Survey ||  || align=right | 2.8 km || 
|-id=560 bgcolor=#FA8072
| 549560 ||  || — || June 23, 2011 || Nogales || M. Schwartz, P. R. Holvorcem ||  || align=right data-sort-value="0.82" | 820 m || 
|-id=561 bgcolor=#E9E9E9
| 549561 ||  || — || July 8, 2003 || Palomar || NEAT ||  || align=right | 1.1 km || 
|-id=562 bgcolor=#d6d6d6
| 549562 ||  || — || June 10, 2011 || Mount Lemmon || Mount Lemmon Survey ||  || align=right | 2.5 km || 
|-id=563 bgcolor=#E9E9E9
| 549563 ||  || — || May 29, 2011 || Mount Lemmon || Mount Lemmon Survey ||  || align=right | 1.2 km || 
|-id=564 bgcolor=#fefefe
| 549564 ||  || — || July 18, 2004 || Campo Imperatore || CINEOS ||  || align=right data-sort-value="0.90" | 900 m || 
|-id=565 bgcolor=#E9E9E9
| 549565 ||  || — || December 18, 2004 || Kitt Peak || Spacewatch ||  || align=right | 1.6 km || 
|-id=566 bgcolor=#d6d6d6
| 549566 ||  || — || June 28, 2011 || Mount Lemmon || Mount Lemmon Survey ||  || align=right | 2.9 km || 
|-id=567 bgcolor=#fefefe
| 549567 ||  || — || June 23, 2011 || Mount Lemmon || Mount Lemmon Survey ||  || align=right data-sort-value="0.94" | 940 m || 
|-id=568 bgcolor=#FA8072
| 549568 ||  || — || June 22, 2011 || Mount Lemmon || Mount Lemmon Survey ||  || align=right data-sort-value="0.75" | 750 m || 
|-id=569 bgcolor=#fefefe
| 549569 ||  || — || December 9, 2012 || Haleakala || Pan-STARRS ||  || align=right | 1.1 km || 
|-id=570 bgcolor=#fefefe
| 549570 ||  || — || February 24, 2014 || Haleakala || Pan-STARRS ||  || align=right data-sort-value="0.86" | 860 m || 
|-id=571 bgcolor=#E9E9E9
| 549571 ||  || — || June 22, 2011 || Mount Lemmon || Mount Lemmon Survey ||  || align=right data-sort-value="0.98" | 980 m || 
|-id=572 bgcolor=#fefefe
| 549572 ||  || — || July 1, 2011 || Mount Lemmon || Mount Lemmon Survey ||  || align=right data-sort-value="0.68" | 680 m || 
|-id=573 bgcolor=#fefefe
| 549573 ||  || — || January 9, 2013 || Kitt Peak || Spacewatch || H || align=right data-sort-value="0.59" | 590 m || 
|-id=574 bgcolor=#E9E9E9
| 549574 ||  || — || July 2, 2011 || Mount Lemmon || Mount Lemmon Survey ||  || align=right data-sort-value="0.94" | 940 m || 
|-id=575 bgcolor=#d6d6d6
| 549575 ||  || — || January 30, 2009 || Mount Lemmon || Mount Lemmon Survey ||  || align=right | 2.7 km || 
|-id=576 bgcolor=#fefefe
| 549576 ||  || — || February 18, 2010 || Kitt Peak || Spacewatch ||  || align=right data-sort-value="0.86" | 860 m || 
|-id=577 bgcolor=#E9E9E9
| 549577 ||  || — || October 4, 2002 || Palomar || NEAT ||  || align=right | 1.7 km || 
|-id=578 bgcolor=#E9E9E9
| 549578 ||  || — || July 31, 2003 || Campo Imperatore || CINEOS ||  || align=right | 1.4 km || 
|-id=579 bgcolor=#E9E9E9
| 549579 ||  || — || December 31, 2008 || Catalina || CSS ||  || align=right | 1.8 km || 
|-id=580 bgcolor=#fefefe
| 549580 ||  || — || July 25, 2011 || Haleakala || Pan-STARRS ||  || align=right data-sort-value="0.71" | 710 m || 
|-id=581 bgcolor=#E9E9E9
| 549581 ||  || — || December 29, 2008 || Kitt Peak || Spacewatch ||  || align=right | 1.5 km || 
|-id=582 bgcolor=#fefefe
| 549582 ||  || — || July 22, 2011 || Haleakala || Pan-STARRS || H || align=right data-sort-value="0.78" | 780 m || 
|-id=583 bgcolor=#E9E9E9
| 549583 ||  || — || July 22, 2011 || Haleakala || Pan-STARRS ||  || align=right | 2.0 km || 
|-id=584 bgcolor=#E9E9E9
| 549584 ||  || — || July 28, 2011 || Haleakala || Pan-STARRS ||  || align=right | 1.2 km || 
|-id=585 bgcolor=#d6d6d6
| 549585 ||  || — || December 5, 2007 || Kitt Peak || Spacewatch ||  || align=right | 3.7 km || 
|-id=586 bgcolor=#d6d6d6
| 549586 ||  || — || July 28, 2011 || Haleakala || Pan-STARRS ||  || align=right | 3.2 km || 
|-id=587 bgcolor=#E9E9E9
| 549587 ||  || — || July 7, 2011 || Siding Spring || SSS ||  || align=right | 1.4 km || 
|-id=588 bgcolor=#d6d6d6
| 549588 ||  || — || July 28, 2011 || Haleakala || Pan-STARRS ||  || align=right | 2.8 km || 
|-id=589 bgcolor=#E9E9E9
| 549589 ||  || — || July 28, 2011 || Haleakala || Pan-STARRS ||  || align=right | 1.7 km || 
|-id=590 bgcolor=#d6d6d6
| 549590 ||  || — || February 19, 2010 || Kitt Peak || Spacewatch ||  || align=right | 2.3 km || 
|-id=591 bgcolor=#fefefe
| 549591 ||  || — || December 12, 2012 || Kitt Peak || Spacewatch ||  || align=right data-sort-value="0.90" | 900 m || 
|-id=592 bgcolor=#fefefe
| 549592 ||  || — || December 1, 2008 || Kitt Peak || Spacewatch ||  || align=right data-sort-value="0.82" | 820 m || 
|-id=593 bgcolor=#fefefe
| 549593 ||  || — || July 7, 2011 || Siding Spring || SSS ||  || align=right data-sort-value="0.62" | 620 m || 
|-id=594 bgcolor=#d6d6d6
| 549594 ||  || — || January 25, 2009 || Kitt Peak || Spacewatch ||  || align=right | 2.8 km || 
|-id=595 bgcolor=#d6d6d6
| 549595 ||  || — || June 22, 2011 || Mount Lemmon || Mount Lemmon Survey ||  || align=right | 3.1 km || 
|-id=596 bgcolor=#fefefe
| 549596 ||  || — || October 26, 2008 || Kitt Peak || Spacewatch ||  || align=right data-sort-value="0.82" | 820 m || 
|-id=597 bgcolor=#E9E9E9
| 549597 ||  || — || July 26, 2011 || Haleakala || Pan-STARRS ||  || align=right | 1.4 km || 
|-id=598 bgcolor=#fefefe
| 549598 ||  || — || July 31, 2011 || Haleakala || Pan-STARRS ||  || align=right data-sort-value="0.82" | 820 m || 
|-id=599 bgcolor=#fefefe
| 549599 ||  || — || July 15, 2004 || Siding Spring || SSS || V || align=right data-sort-value="0.71" | 710 m || 
|-id=600 bgcolor=#d6d6d6
| 549600 ||  || — || December 31, 2008 || Mount Lemmon || Mount Lemmon Survey ||  || align=right | 2.7 km || 
|}

549601–549700 

|-bgcolor=#fefefe
| 549601 ||  || — || March 15, 2007 || Mount Lemmon || Mount Lemmon Survey ||  || align=right data-sort-value="0.90" | 900 m || 
|-id=602 bgcolor=#d6d6d6
| 549602 ||  || — || July 31, 2011 || Haleakala || Pan-STARRS ||  || align=right | 2.7 km || 
|-id=603 bgcolor=#fefefe
| 549603 ||  || — || August 23, 2004 || Kitt Peak || Spacewatch ||  || align=right data-sort-value="0.71" | 710 m || 
|-id=604 bgcolor=#d6d6d6
| 549604 ||  || — || May 9, 2005 || Kitt Peak || Spacewatch ||  || align=right | 2.9 km || 
|-id=605 bgcolor=#fefefe
| 549605 ||  || — || May 13, 2007 || Mount Lemmon || Mount Lemmon Survey ||  || align=right data-sort-value="0.78" | 780 m || 
|-id=606 bgcolor=#fefefe
| 549606 ||  || — || June 22, 2011 || Kitt Peak || Spacewatch ||  || align=right data-sort-value="0.86" | 860 m || 
|-id=607 bgcolor=#E9E9E9
| 549607 ||  || — || July 26, 2011 || Haleakala || Pan-STARRS ||  || align=right | 1.4 km || 
|-id=608 bgcolor=#d6d6d6
| 549608 ||  || — || May 20, 2005 || Palomar || NEAT ||  || align=right | 3.5 km || 
|-id=609 bgcolor=#E9E9E9
| 549609 ||  || — || November 13, 2012 || Kitt Peak || Spacewatch ||  || align=right | 1.3 km || 
|-id=610 bgcolor=#E9E9E9
| 549610 ||  || — || October 3, 2016 || Oukaimeden || M. Ory ||  || align=right | 1.5 km || 
|-id=611 bgcolor=#d6d6d6
| 549611 ||  || — || October 10, 2012 || Mount Lemmon || Mount Lemmon Survey ||  || align=right | 3.2 km || 
|-id=612 bgcolor=#E9E9E9
| 549612 ||  || — || February 5, 2013 || Kitt Peak || Spacewatch ||  || align=right | 1.0 km || 
|-id=613 bgcolor=#E9E9E9
| 549613 ||  || — || June 15, 2015 || Haleakala || Pan-STARRS ||  || align=right | 1.1 km || 
|-id=614 bgcolor=#E9E9E9
| 549614 ||  || — || December 6, 2012 || Kitt Peak || Spacewatch ||  || align=right | 1.6 km || 
|-id=615 bgcolor=#fefefe
| 549615 ||  || — || August 9, 2015 || Haleakala || Pan-STARRS ||  || align=right data-sort-value="0.82" | 820 m || 
|-id=616 bgcolor=#E9E9E9
| 549616 ||  || — || December 24, 2017 || Haleakala || Pan-STARRS ||  || align=right | 1.3 km || 
|-id=617 bgcolor=#d6d6d6
| 549617 ||  || — || July 27, 2011 || Haleakala || Pan-STARRS ||  || align=right | 2.9 km || 
|-id=618 bgcolor=#d6d6d6
| 549618 ||  || — || July 28, 2011 || Haleakala || Pan-STARRS ||  || align=right | 2.9 km || 
|-id=619 bgcolor=#fefefe
| 549619 ||  || — || March 2, 2005 || Kitt Peak || Spacewatch || H || align=right data-sort-value="0.59" | 590 m || 
|-id=620 bgcolor=#fefefe
| 549620 ||  || — || August 1, 2011 || Haleakala || Pan-STARRS || H || align=right data-sort-value="0.50" | 500 m || 
|-id=621 bgcolor=#E9E9E9
| 549621 ||  || — || August 3, 2011 || Haleakala || Pan-STARRS ||  || align=right | 1.8 km || 
|-id=622 bgcolor=#fefefe
| 549622 ||  || — || August 6, 2011 || Haleakala || Pan-STARRS ||  || align=right | 1.0 km || 
|-id=623 bgcolor=#fefefe
| 549623 ||  || — || July 28, 2011 || Haleakala || Pan-STARRS ||  || align=right data-sort-value="0.68" | 680 m || 
|-id=624 bgcolor=#fefefe
| 549624 ||  || — || August 6, 2011 || Haleakala || Pan-STARRS || H || align=right data-sort-value="0.57" | 570 m || 
|-id=625 bgcolor=#E9E9E9
| 549625 ||  || — || November 7, 2012 || Mount Lemmon || Mount Lemmon Survey ||  || align=right | 1.8 km || 
|-id=626 bgcolor=#fefefe
| 549626 ||  || — || August 4, 2011 || Haleakala || Pan-STARRS ||  || align=right data-sort-value="0.71" | 710 m || 
|-id=627 bgcolor=#fefefe
| 549627 ||  || — || July 25, 2015 || Haleakala || Pan-STARRS ||  || align=right data-sort-value="0.82" | 820 m || 
|-id=628 bgcolor=#fefefe
| 549628 ||  || — || January 9, 2007 || Kitt Peak || Spacewatch || H || align=right data-sort-value="0.57" | 570 m || 
|-id=629 bgcolor=#E9E9E9
| 549629 ||  || — || November 8, 2007 || Kitt Peak || Spacewatch ||  || align=right | 1.5 km || 
|-id=630 bgcolor=#E9E9E9
| 549630 ||  || — || October 19, 2003 || Palomar || NEAT ||  || align=right | 1.0 km || 
|-id=631 bgcolor=#E9E9E9
| 549631 ||  || — || August 20, 2011 || Haleakala || Pan-STARRS ||  || align=right | 1.8 km || 
|-id=632 bgcolor=#d6d6d6
| 549632 ||  || — || August 20, 2011 || Haleakala || Pan-STARRS || 7:4 || align=right | 3.4 km || 
|-id=633 bgcolor=#E9E9E9
| 549633 ||  || — || August 16, 2002 || Kitt Peak || Spacewatch ||  || align=right | 2.0 km || 
|-id=634 bgcolor=#fefefe
| 549634 ||  || — || August 4, 2011 || La Sagra || OAM Obs. || H || align=right data-sort-value="0.82" | 820 m || 
|-id=635 bgcolor=#E9E9E9
| 549635 ||  || — || August 4, 2002 || Palomar || NEAT ||  || align=right | 1.8 km || 
|-id=636 bgcolor=#E9E9E9
| 549636 ||  || — || August 23, 2011 || Haleakala || Pan-STARRS ||  || align=right | 1.9 km || 
|-id=637 bgcolor=#fefefe
| 549637 ||  || — || August 24, 2011 || Sandlot || G. Hug || H || align=right data-sort-value="0.75" | 750 m || 
|-id=638 bgcolor=#d6d6d6
| 549638 ||  || — || January 30, 2003 || Palomar || NEAT || EOS || align=right | 3.4 km || 
|-id=639 bgcolor=#fefefe
| 549639 ||  || — || August 20, 2011 || Haleakala || Pan-STARRS ||  || align=right data-sort-value="0.75" | 750 m || 
|-id=640 bgcolor=#E9E9E9
| 549640 ||  || — || August 22, 2011 || Crni Vrh || S. Matičič ||  || align=right | 1.9 km || 
|-id=641 bgcolor=#d6d6d6
| 549641 ||  || — || July 12, 2005 || Mount Lemmon || Mount Lemmon Survey || THM || align=right | 3.2 km || 
|-id=642 bgcolor=#fefefe
| 549642 ||  || — || November 1, 2008 || Mount Lemmon || Mount Lemmon Survey ||  || align=right data-sort-value="0.86" | 860 m || 
|-id=643 bgcolor=#FA8072
| 549643 ||  || — || August 25, 2011 || La Sagra || OAM Obs. ||  || align=right data-sort-value="0.86" | 860 m || 
|-id=644 bgcolor=#E9E9E9
| 549644 ||  || — || August 26, 2011 || Kitt Peak || Spacewatch ||  || align=right | 1.8 km || 
|-id=645 bgcolor=#fefefe
| 549645 ||  || — || April 27, 2006 || Cerro Tololo || Cerro Tololo Obs. || NYS || align=right data-sort-value="0.58" | 580 m || 
|-id=646 bgcolor=#fefefe
| 549646 ||  || — || August 1, 2000 || Socorro || LINEAR ||  || align=right data-sort-value="0.82" | 820 m || 
|-id=647 bgcolor=#E9E9E9
| 549647 ||  || — || April 10, 2010 || Mount Lemmon || Mount Lemmon Survey ||  || align=right | 2.6 km || 
|-id=648 bgcolor=#E9E9E9
| 549648 Shirokov ||  ||  || August 27, 2011 || Zelenchukskaya Stn || T. V. Kryachko, B. Satovski ||  || align=right | 1.3 km || 
|-id=649 bgcolor=#E9E9E9
| 549649 ||  || — || August 28, 2011 || Haleakala || Pan-STARRS || EUN || align=right | 1.0 km || 
|-id=650 bgcolor=#E9E9E9
| 549650 ||  || — || August 28, 2011 || Zelenchukskaya Stn || T. V. Kryachko, B. Satovski ||  || align=right | 1.7 km || 
|-id=651 bgcolor=#E9E9E9
| 549651 ||  || — || April 9, 2010 || Mount Lemmon || Mount Lemmon Survey ||  || align=right | 1.3 km || 
|-id=652 bgcolor=#d6d6d6
| 549652 ||  || — || February 26, 2008 || Mount Lemmon || Mount Lemmon Survey || 7:4 || align=right | 3.7 km || 
|-id=653 bgcolor=#E9E9E9
| 549653 ||  || — || September 14, 2007 || Mount Lemmon || Mount Lemmon Survey ||  || align=right | 1.9 km || 
|-id=654 bgcolor=#fefefe
| 549654 ||  || — || August 19, 2011 || Haleakala || Pan-STARRS ||  || align=right data-sort-value="0.82" | 820 m || 
|-id=655 bgcolor=#fefefe
| 549655 ||  || — || February 9, 2007 || Catalina || CSS || H || align=right data-sort-value="0.71" | 710 m || 
|-id=656 bgcolor=#E9E9E9
| 549656 ||  || — || August 28, 2011 || Haleakala || Pan-STARRS ||  || align=right | 1.5 km || 
|-id=657 bgcolor=#fefefe
| 549657 ||  || — || August 30, 2011 || Haleakala || Pan-STARRS || H || align=right data-sort-value="0.78" | 780 m || 
|-id=658 bgcolor=#fefefe
| 549658 ||  || — || September 27, 1997 || Kitt Peak || Spacewatch ||  || align=right data-sort-value="0.65" | 650 m || 
|-id=659 bgcolor=#E9E9E9
| 549659 ||  || — || September 28, 2002 || Haleakala || AMOS ||  || align=right | 2.6 km || 
|-id=660 bgcolor=#E9E9E9
| 549660 ||  || — || October 6, 2002 || Haleakala || AMOS ||  || align=right | 2.5 km || 
|-id=661 bgcolor=#d6d6d6
| 549661 ||  || — || August 4, 2011 || Siding Spring || SSS ||  || align=right | 3.7 km || 
|-id=662 bgcolor=#C2FFFF
| 549662 ||  || — || August 25, 2000 || Cerro Tololo || R. Millis, L. H. Wasserman || L5 || align=right | 12 km || 
|-id=663 bgcolor=#fefefe
| 549663 Barczaszabolcs ||  ||  || August 10, 2011 || Piszkesteto || K. Sárneczky, A. Pál || V || align=right data-sort-value="0.68" | 680 m || 
|-id=664 bgcolor=#fefefe
| 549664 ||  || — || August 29, 2011 || Siding Spring || SSS ||  || align=right data-sort-value="0.75" | 750 m || 
|-id=665 bgcolor=#fefefe
| 549665 ||  || — || August 30, 2011 || Haleakala || Pan-STARRS ||  || align=right | 1.3 km || 
|-id=666 bgcolor=#E9E9E9
| 549666 ||  || — || August 30, 2011 || Calvin-Rehoboth || L. A. Molnar ||  || align=right | 1.6 km || 
|-id=667 bgcolor=#d6d6d6
| 549667 ||  || — || August 21, 2011 || Haleakala || Pan-STARRS ||  || align=right | 3.4 km || 
|-id=668 bgcolor=#fefefe
| 549668 ||  || — || August 23, 2011 || Haleakala || Pan-STARRS ||  || align=right data-sort-value="0.90" | 900 m || 
|-id=669 bgcolor=#d6d6d6
| 549669 ||  || — || January 31, 2009 || Mount Lemmon || Mount Lemmon Survey ||  || align=right | 2.9 km || 
|-id=670 bgcolor=#d6d6d6
| 549670 ||  || — || June 17, 2010 || Mount Lemmon || Mount Lemmon Survey ||  || align=right | 2.9 km || 
|-id=671 bgcolor=#E9E9E9
| 549671 ||  || — || August 30, 2011 || Haleakala || Pan-STARRS ||  || align=right | 1.4 km || 
|-id=672 bgcolor=#fefefe
| 549672 ||  || — || April 19, 2006 || Mount Lemmon || Mount Lemmon Survey ||  || align=right data-sort-value="0.94" | 940 m || 
|-id=673 bgcolor=#fefefe
| 549673 ||  || — || August 30, 2011 || La Sagra || OAM Obs. ||  || align=right data-sort-value="0.86" | 860 m || 
|-id=674 bgcolor=#E9E9E9
| 549674 ||  || — || August 31, 2011 || Piszkesteto || K. Sárneczky ||  || align=right | 1.6 km || 
|-id=675 bgcolor=#E9E9E9
| 549675 ||  || — || January 10, 2013 || Haleakala || Pan-STARRS ||  || align=right | 1.8 km || 
|-id=676 bgcolor=#E9E9E9
| 549676 ||  || — || March 16, 2004 || Mauna Kea || Q. s. observers ||  || align=right | 1.6 km || 
|-id=677 bgcolor=#fefefe
| 549677 ||  || — || March 23, 2014 || Kitt Peak || Spacewatch ||  || align=right | 1.1 km || 
|-id=678 bgcolor=#E9E9E9
| 549678 ||  || — || January 7, 2013 || Haleakala || Pan-STARRS ||  || align=right | 2.1 km || 
|-id=679 bgcolor=#fefefe
| 549679 ||  || — || April 30, 2014 || Haleakala || Pan-STARRS ||  || align=right data-sort-value="0.98" | 980 m || 
|-id=680 bgcolor=#fefefe
| 549680 ||  || — || February 19, 2013 || Kitt Peak || Spacewatch || H || align=right data-sort-value="0.53" | 530 m || 
|-id=681 bgcolor=#E9E9E9
| 549681 ||  || — || February 1, 2017 || Mount Lemmon || Mount Lemmon Survey ||  || align=right data-sort-value="0.82" | 820 m || 
|-id=682 bgcolor=#d6d6d6
| 549682 ||  || — || February 18, 2015 || Haleakala || Pan-STARRS ||  || align=right | 3.0 km || 
|-id=683 bgcolor=#E9E9E9
| 549683 ||  || — || October 12, 2016 || Mount Lemmon || Mount Lemmon Survey ||  || align=right | 2.5 km || 
|-id=684 bgcolor=#E9E9E9
| 549684 ||  || — || August 30, 2011 || Haleakala || Pan-STARRS ||  || align=right | 1.2 km || 
|-id=685 bgcolor=#d6d6d6
| 549685 ||  || — || September 1, 2011 || Kachina || J. Hobart ||  || align=right | 3.4 km || 
|-id=686 bgcolor=#E9E9E9
| 549686 ||  || — || September 4, 2011 || Haleakala || Pan-STARRS ||  || align=right | 1.8 km || 
|-id=687 bgcolor=#FA8072
| 549687 ||  || — || September 4, 2011 || Haleakala || Pan-STARRS ||  || align=right data-sort-value="0.45" | 450 m || 
|-id=688 bgcolor=#E9E9E9
| 549688 ||  || — || September 5, 2011 || Haleakala || Pan-STARRS ||  || align=right | 1.7 km || 
|-id=689 bgcolor=#fefefe
| 549689 ||  || — || December 14, 2006 || Kitt Peak || Spacewatch || H || align=right data-sort-value="0.82" | 820 m || 
|-id=690 bgcolor=#fefefe
| 549690 ||  || — || September 4, 2011 || Haleakala || Pan-STARRS || H || align=right data-sort-value="0.68" | 680 m || 
|-id=691 bgcolor=#fefefe
| 549691 ||  || — || August 6, 2007 || Lulin || LUSS || NYS || align=right data-sort-value="0.79" | 790 m || 
|-id=692 bgcolor=#E9E9E9
| 549692 ||  || — || September 8, 2011 || Kitt Peak || Spacewatch || AGN || align=right data-sort-value="0.92" | 920 m || 
|-id=693 bgcolor=#fefefe
| 549693 ||  || — || September 8, 2011 || Kitt Peak || Spacewatch ||  || align=right data-sort-value="0.86" | 860 m || 
|-id=694 bgcolor=#E9E9E9
| 549694 ||  || — || September 4, 2011 || Haleakala || Pan-STARRS ||  || align=right | 1.9 km || 
|-id=695 bgcolor=#fefefe
| 549695 ||  || — || September 4, 2011 || Haleakala || Pan-STARRS ||  || align=right data-sort-value="0.86" | 860 m || 
|-id=696 bgcolor=#fefefe
| 549696 ||  || — || September 2, 2011 || Haleakala || Pan-STARRS ||  || align=right data-sort-value="0.75" | 750 m || 
|-id=697 bgcolor=#E9E9E9
| 549697 ||  || — || September 2, 2011 || Haleakala || Pan-STARRS ||  || align=right | 1.6 km || 
|-id=698 bgcolor=#fefefe
| 549698 ||  || — || September 4, 2011 || Haleakala || Pan-STARRS ||  || align=right data-sort-value="0.86" | 860 m || 
|-id=699 bgcolor=#E9E9E9
| 549699 ||  || — || September 6, 2011 || Haleakala || Pan-STARRS ||  || align=right data-sort-value="0.65" | 650 m || 
|-id=700 bgcolor=#fefefe
| 549700 ||  || — || September 4, 2011 || Haleakala || Pan-STARRS ||  || align=right data-sort-value="0.78" | 780 m || 
|}

549701–549800 

|-bgcolor=#fefefe
| 549701 ||  || — || September 2, 2011 || Haleakala || Pan-STARRS || H || align=right data-sort-value="0.47" | 470 m || 
|-id=702 bgcolor=#E9E9E9
| 549702 ||  || — || October 5, 2002 || Palomar || NEAT || AGN || align=right | 1.0 km || 
|-id=703 bgcolor=#FA8072
| 549703 ||  || — || September 17, 2011 || La Sagra || OAM Obs. ||  || align=right | 1.2 km || 
|-id=704 bgcolor=#E9E9E9
| 549704 ||  || — || September 19, 2011 || Sandlot || G. Hug ||  || align=right | 1.2 km || 
|-id=705 bgcolor=#fefefe
| 549705 ||  || — || June 9, 2011 || Mount Lemmon || Mount Lemmon Survey ||  || align=right data-sort-value="0.98" | 980 m || 
|-id=706 bgcolor=#E9E9E9
| 549706 Spbuni ||  ||  || September 21, 2011 || Zelenchukskaya Stn || T. V. Kryachko, B. Satovski ||  || align=right | 1.8 km || 
|-id=707 bgcolor=#E9E9E9
| 549707 ||  || — || February 19, 2009 || Kitt Peak || Spacewatch ||  || align=right | 1.9 km || 
|-id=708 bgcolor=#fefefe
| 549708 ||  || — || September 20, 2011 || Kitt Peak || Spacewatch ||  || align=right data-sort-value="0.78" | 780 m || 
|-id=709 bgcolor=#E9E9E9
| 549709 ||  || — || February 19, 2009 || Mount Lemmon || Mount Lemmon Survey ||  || align=right | 2.2 km || 
|-id=710 bgcolor=#E9E9E9
| 549710 ||  || — || January 18, 2009 || Mount Lemmon || Mount Lemmon Survey ||  || align=right | 1.5 km || 
|-id=711 bgcolor=#E9E9E9
| 549711 ||  || — || September 18, 2011 || Mount Lemmon || Mount Lemmon Survey ||  || align=right | 1.9 km || 
|-id=712 bgcolor=#E9E9E9
| 549712 ||  || — || October 20, 2007 || Mount Lemmon || Mount Lemmon Survey ||  || align=right | 1.6 km || 
|-id=713 bgcolor=#E9E9E9
| 549713 ||  || — || September 23, 2011 || Haleakala || Pan-STARRS ||  || align=right data-sort-value="0.75" | 750 m || 
|-id=714 bgcolor=#fefefe
| 549714 ||  || — || March 26, 2006 || Kitt Peak || Spacewatch ||  || align=right data-sort-value="0.82" | 820 m || 
|-id=715 bgcolor=#E9E9E9
| 549715 ||  || — || September 23, 2011 || Haleakala || Pan-STARRS ||  || align=right | 2.3 km || 
|-id=716 bgcolor=#fefefe
| 549716 ||  || — || September 23, 2011 || Haleakala || Pan-STARRS ||  || align=right data-sort-value="0.94" | 940 m || 
|-id=717 bgcolor=#E9E9E9
| 549717 ||  || — || September 18, 2011 || Mount Lemmon || Mount Lemmon Survey ||  || align=right | 1.7 km || 
|-id=718 bgcolor=#E9E9E9
| 549718 ||  || — || September 18, 2011 || Mount Lemmon || Mount Lemmon Survey ||  || align=right | 1.5 km || 
|-id=719 bgcolor=#E9E9E9
| 549719 ||  || — || November 21, 2003 || Kitt Peak || Spacewatch ||  || align=right | 1.7 km || 
|-id=720 bgcolor=#E9E9E9
| 549720 ||  || — || June 11, 2011 || Haleakala || Pan-STARRS ||  || align=right | 2.0 km || 
|-id=721 bgcolor=#E9E9E9
| 549721 ||  || — || September 20, 2011 || La Sagra || OAM Obs. ||  || align=right | 1.9 km || 
|-id=722 bgcolor=#fefefe
| 549722 ||  || — || September 21, 2011 || Catalina || CSS ||  || align=right | 1.0 km || 
|-id=723 bgcolor=#E9E9E9
| 549723 ||  || — || September 23, 2011 || Mount Lemmon || Mount Lemmon Survey ||  || align=right | 2.3 km || 
|-id=724 bgcolor=#E9E9E9
| 549724 ||  || — || September 23, 2011 || Haleakala || Pan-STARRS ||  || align=right | 1.8 km || 
|-id=725 bgcolor=#fefefe
| 549725 ||  || — || February 16, 2010 || Mount Lemmon || Mount Lemmon Survey ||  || align=right data-sort-value="0.68" | 680 m || 
|-id=726 bgcolor=#E9E9E9
| 549726 ||  || — || September 20, 2011 || Mount Lemmon || Mount Lemmon Survey ||  || align=right | 2.2 km || 
|-id=727 bgcolor=#fefefe
| 549727 ||  || — || September 7, 2004 || Goodricke-Pigott || R. A. Tucker || critical || align=right data-sort-value="0.62" | 620 m || 
|-id=728 bgcolor=#fefefe
| 549728 ||  || — || September 21, 2011 || Kitt Peak || Spacewatch ||  || align=right data-sort-value="0.94" | 940 m || 
|-id=729 bgcolor=#E9E9E9
| 549729 ||  || — || September 21, 2011 || Kitt Peak || Spacewatch ||  || align=right | 2.3 km || 
|-id=730 bgcolor=#E9E9E9
| 549730 ||  || — || September 22, 2011 || Mount Lemmon || Mount Lemmon Survey ||  || align=right | 1.6 km || 
|-id=731 bgcolor=#E9E9E9
| 549731 ||  || — || September 22, 2011 || Kitt Peak || Spacewatch ||  || align=right | 2.0 km || 
|-id=732 bgcolor=#fefefe
| 549732 ||  || — || December 31, 2008 || Bergisch Gladbach || W. Bickel ||  || align=right data-sort-value="0.98" | 980 m || 
|-id=733 bgcolor=#fefefe
| 549733 ||  || — || March 5, 2006 || Kitt Peak || Spacewatch ||  || align=right | 1.1 km || 
|-id=734 bgcolor=#E9E9E9
| 549734 ||  || — || November 14, 2002 || Palomar || NEAT ||  || align=right | 2.2 km || 
|-id=735 bgcolor=#fefefe
| 549735 ||  || — || September 18, 2011 || Mount Lemmon || Mount Lemmon Survey ||  || align=right data-sort-value="0.78" | 780 m || 
|-id=736 bgcolor=#d6d6d6
| 549736 ||  || — || September 24, 2011 || Mount Lemmon || Mount Lemmon Survey ||  || align=right | 2.4 km || 
|-id=737 bgcolor=#E9E9E9
| 549737 ||  || — || November 18, 2003 || Kitt Peak || Spacewatch ||  || align=right | 1.7 km || 
|-id=738 bgcolor=#fefefe
| 549738 ||  || — || September 4, 2011 || Haleakala || Pan-STARRS || H || align=right data-sort-value="0.49" | 490 m || 
|-id=739 bgcolor=#fefefe
| 549739 ||  || — || April 25, 2003 || Anderson Mesa || LONEOS ||  || align=right data-sort-value="0.98" | 980 m || 
|-id=740 bgcolor=#E9E9E9
| 549740 ||  || — || September 4, 2011 || Haleakala || Pan-STARRS ||  || align=right | 2.2 km || 
|-id=741 bgcolor=#E9E9E9
| 549741 ||  || — || October 27, 2003 || Kitt Peak || Spacewatch ||  || align=right | 2.3 km || 
|-id=742 bgcolor=#d6d6d6
| 549742 ||  || — || August 4, 2005 || Palomar || NEAT ||  || align=right | 3.5 km || 
|-id=743 bgcolor=#E9E9E9
| 549743 ||  || — || June 23, 2001 || Palomar || NEAT ||  || align=right | 3.4 km || 
|-id=744 bgcolor=#E9E9E9
| 549744 Heimpál ||  ||  || September 25, 2011 || Piszkesteto || K. Sárneczky, A. Farkas ||  || align=right | 1.8 km || 
|-id=745 bgcolor=#fefefe
| 549745 ||  || — || September 18, 2011 || Mount Lemmon || Mount Lemmon Survey ||  || align=right data-sort-value="0.68" | 680 m || 
|-id=746 bgcolor=#fefefe
| 549746 ||  || — || October 23, 2004 || Kitt Peak || Spacewatch ||  || align=right data-sort-value="0.78" | 780 m || 
|-id=747 bgcolor=#fefefe
| 549747 ||  || — || July 10, 2007 || Lulin || LUSS ||  || align=right data-sort-value="0.94" | 940 m || 
|-id=748 bgcolor=#E9E9E9
| 549748 ||  || — || October 14, 2007 || Mount Lemmon || Mount Lemmon Survey ||  || align=right | 1.2 km || 
|-id=749 bgcolor=#fefefe
| 549749 ||  || — || September 20, 2011 || Kitt Peak || Spacewatch ||  || align=right data-sort-value="0.90" | 900 m || 
|-id=750 bgcolor=#fefefe
| 549750 ||  || — || September 21, 2011 || Kitt Peak || Spacewatch ||  || align=right data-sort-value="0.75" | 750 m || 
|-id=751 bgcolor=#E9E9E9
| 549751 ||  || — || September 26, 2011 || Haleakala || Pan-STARRS ||  || align=right | 2.3 km || 
|-id=752 bgcolor=#fefefe
| 549752 ||  || — || August 25, 2011 || Dauban || C. Rinner, F. Kugel || MAS || align=right data-sort-value="0.75" | 750 m || 
|-id=753 bgcolor=#E9E9E9
| 549753 ||  || — || September 26, 2011 || Haleakala || Pan-STARRS ||  || align=right | 2.1 km || 
|-id=754 bgcolor=#fefefe
| 549754 ||  || — || August 27, 2011 || Piszkesteto || K. Sárneczky ||  || align=right | 1.1 km || 
|-id=755 bgcolor=#E9E9E9
| 549755 ||  || — || September 22, 2011 || Mount Lemmon || Mount Lemmon Survey ||  || align=right | 1.9 km || 
|-id=756 bgcolor=#d6d6d6
| 549756 ||  || — || September 23, 2011 || Kitt Peak || Spacewatch ||  || align=right | 2.8 km || 
|-id=757 bgcolor=#fefefe
| 549757 ||  || — || September 21, 2011 || Mount Lemmon || Mount Lemmon Survey || H || align=right data-sort-value="0.68" | 680 m || 
|-id=758 bgcolor=#fefefe
| 549758 ||  || — || August 28, 2003 || Palomar || NEAT ||  || align=right data-sort-value="0.98" | 980 m || 
|-id=759 bgcolor=#E9E9E9
| 549759 ||  || — || February 12, 2004 || Kitt Peak || Spacewatch ||  || align=right | 1.8 km || 
|-id=760 bgcolor=#E9E9E9
| 549760 ||  || — || September 26, 2011 || Haleakala || Pan-STARRS ||  || align=right data-sort-value="0.75" | 750 m || 
|-id=761 bgcolor=#E9E9E9
| 549761 ||  || — || November 4, 2007 || Mount Lemmon || Mount Lemmon Survey ||  || align=right | 1.2 km || 
|-id=762 bgcolor=#E9E9E9
| 549762 ||  || — || September 29, 2011 || Mount Lemmon || Mount Lemmon Survey ||  || align=right | 1.8 km || 
|-id=763 bgcolor=#E9E9E9
| 549763 ||  || — || October 15, 2002 || Palomar || NEAT ||  || align=right | 2.7 km || 
|-id=764 bgcolor=#E9E9E9
| 549764 ||  || — || July 21, 2006 || Mount Lemmon || Mount Lemmon Survey ||  || align=right | 2.3 km || 
|-id=765 bgcolor=#fefefe
| 549765 ||  || — || October 8, 2004 || Kitt Peak || Spacewatch ||  || align=right data-sort-value="0.54" | 540 m || 
|-id=766 bgcolor=#E9E9E9
| 549766 ||  || — || September 2, 2011 || Haleakala || Pan-STARRS ||  || align=right | 1.6 km || 
|-id=767 bgcolor=#fefefe
| 549767 ||  || — || March 9, 2005 || Kitt Peak || Spacewatch || H || align=right data-sort-value="0.68" | 680 m || 
|-id=768 bgcolor=#fefefe
| 549768 ||  || — || September 5, 2000 || Kitt Peak || Spacewatch ||  || align=right data-sort-value="0.82" | 820 m || 
|-id=769 bgcolor=#fefefe
| 549769 ||  || — || September 20, 2011 || Kitt Peak || Spacewatch || V || align=right data-sort-value="0.68" | 680 m || 
|-id=770 bgcolor=#fefefe
| 549770 ||  || — || September 20, 2011 || Kitt Peak || Spacewatch || NYS || align=right data-sort-value="0.60" | 600 m || 
|-id=771 bgcolor=#fefefe
| 549771 ||  || — || August 31, 2011 || Haleakala || Pan-STARRS || CLA || align=right | 1.7 km || 
|-id=772 bgcolor=#fefefe
| 549772 ||  || — || March 13, 2010 || Mount Lemmon || Mount Lemmon Survey ||  || align=right data-sort-value="0.98" | 980 m || 
|-id=773 bgcolor=#d6d6d6
| 549773 ||  || — || November 23, 2006 || Mount Lemmon || Mount Lemmon Survey ||  || align=right | 3.1 km || 
|-id=774 bgcolor=#fefefe
| 549774 ||  || — || September 25, 2011 || Haleakala || Pan-STARRS ||  || align=right | 1.1 km || 
|-id=775 bgcolor=#fefefe
| 549775 ||  || — || January 16, 2009 || Kitt Peak || Spacewatch ||  || align=right data-sort-value="0.78" | 780 m || 
|-id=776 bgcolor=#E9E9E9
| 549776 ||  || — || September 27, 2011 || La Sagra || OAM Obs. ||  || align=right | 1.4 km || 
|-id=777 bgcolor=#E9E9E9
| 549777 ||  || — || September 24, 2011 || Bergisch Gladbach || W. Bickel ||  || align=right | 1.8 km || 
|-id=778 bgcolor=#fefefe
| 549778 ||  || — || March 18, 2010 || Mount Lemmon || Mount Lemmon Survey ||  || align=right data-sort-value="0.86" | 860 m || 
|-id=779 bgcolor=#d6d6d6
| 549779 ||  || — || August 26, 2005 || Palomar || NEAT || HYG || align=right | 3.1 km || 
|-id=780 bgcolor=#E9E9E9
| 549780 ||  || — || September 29, 2011 || Mount Lemmon || Mount Lemmon Survey ||  || align=right data-sort-value="0.86" | 860 m || 
|-id=781 bgcolor=#E9E9E9
| 549781 ||  || — || October 24, 2003 || Kitt Peak || Spacewatch ||  || align=right data-sort-value="0.94" | 940 m || 
|-id=782 bgcolor=#E9E9E9
| 549782 ||  || — || September 26, 2011 || Mount Lemmon || Mount Lemmon Survey ||  || align=right | 1.2 km || 
|-id=783 bgcolor=#fefefe
| 549783 ||  || — || September 26, 2011 || Mount Lemmon || Mount Lemmon Survey ||  || align=right data-sort-value="0.65" | 650 m || 
|-id=784 bgcolor=#fefefe
| 549784 ||  || — || February 15, 2010 || Kitt Peak || Spacewatch ||  || align=right data-sort-value="0.82" | 820 m || 
|-id=785 bgcolor=#d6d6d6
| 549785 ||  || — || September 29, 2011 || Mount Lemmon || Mount Lemmon Survey ||  || align=right | 3.5 km || 
|-id=786 bgcolor=#E9E9E9
| 549786 ||  || — || September 8, 2011 || Kitt Peak || Spacewatch ||  || align=right | 1.7 km || 
|-id=787 bgcolor=#E9E9E9
| 549787 ||  || — || September 20, 2007 || Catalina || CSS ||  || align=right | 1.1 km || 
|-id=788 bgcolor=#fefefe
| 549788 ||  || — || September 24, 2011 || Haleakala || Pan-STARRS || H || align=right data-sort-value="0.62" | 620 m || 
|-id=789 bgcolor=#fefefe
| 549789 ||  || — || September 3, 2007 || Catalina || CSS || NYS || align=right data-sort-value="0.60" | 600 m || 
|-id=790 bgcolor=#E9E9E9
| 549790 ||  || — || September 26, 2011 || Catalina || CSS ||  || align=right | 2.2 km || 
|-id=791 bgcolor=#fefefe
| 549791 ||  || — || August 30, 2011 || Haleakala || Pan-STARRS ||  || align=right data-sort-value="0.86" | 860 m || 
|-id=792 bgcolor=#fefefe
| 549792 ||  || — || November 1, 2008 || Mount Lemmon || Mount Lemmon Survey ||  || align=right data-sort-value="0.76" | 760 m || 
|-id=793 bgcolor=#E9E9E9
| 549793 ||  || — || November 5, 2007 || Kitt Peak || Spacewatch ||  || align=right | 1.9 km || 
|-id=794 bgcolor=#fefefe
| 549794 ||  || — || September 11, 2007 || XuYi || PMO NEO ||  || align=right data-sort-value="0.78" | 780 m || 
|-id=795 bgcolor=#E9E9E9
| 549795 ||  || — || September 24, 2011 || Haleakala || Pan-STARRS ||  || align=right data-sort-value="0.94" | 940 m || 
|-id=796 bgcolor=#fefefe
| 549796 ||  || — || September 19, 2011 || Haleakala || Pan-STARRS ||  || align=right data-sort-value="0.94" | 940 m || 
|-id=797 bgcolor=#fefefe
| 549797 ||  || — || September 23, 2011 || Kitt Peak || Spacewatch ||  || align=right data-sort-value="0.78" | 780 m || 
|-id=798 bgcolor=#d6d6d6
| 549798 ||  || — || February 16, 2015 || Haleakala || Pan-STARRS ||  || align=right | 3.3 km || 
|-id=799 bgcolor=#fefefe
| 549799 ||  || — || April 8, 2014 || Kitt Peak || Spacewatch ||  || align=right data-sort-value="0.94" | 940 m || 
|-id=800 bgcolor=#d6d6d6
| 549800 ||  || — || September 21, 2011 || Mount Lemmon || Mount Lemmon Survey ||  || align=right | 3.1 km || 
|}

549801–549900 

|-bgcolor=#fefefe
| 549801 ||  || — || January 10, 2013 || Haleakala || Pan-STARRS ||  || align=right data-sort-value="0.75" | 750 m || 
|-id=802 bgcolor=#d6d6d6
| 549802 ||  || — || September 29, 2011 || Mount Lemmon || Mount Lemmon Survey || 7:4 || align=right | 3.4 km || 
|-id=803 bgcolor=#E9E9E9
| 549803 ||  || — || January 26, 2017 || Haleakala || Pan-STARRS ||  || align=right data-sort-value="0.94" | 940 m || 
|-id=804 bgcolor=#E9E9E9
| 549804 ||  || — || September 20, 2011 || Haleakala || Pan-STARRS ||  || align=right | 1.5 km || 
|-id=805 bgcolor=#E9E9E9
| 549805 ||  || — || October 7, 2016 || Mount Lemmon || Mount Lemmon Survey ||  || align=right | 1.8 km || 
|-id=806 bgcolor=#E9E9E9
| 549806 ||  || — || January 15, 2018 || Haleakala || Pan-STARRS ||  || align=right | 1.5 km || 
|-id=807 bgcolor=#E9E9E9
| 549807 ||  || — || September 19, 2011 || Haleakala || Pan-STARRS ||  || align=right | 1.7 km || 
|-id=808 bgcolor=#E9E9E9
| 549808 ||  || — || February 7, 2013 || Kitt Peak || Spacewatch ||  || align=right data-sort-value="0.78" | 780 m || 
|-id=809 bgcolor=#fefefe
| 549809 ||  || — || September 21, 2011 || Haleakala || Pan-STARRS ||  || align=right data-sort-value="0.71" | 710 m || 
|-id=810 bgcolor=#E9E9E9
| 549810 ||  || — || September 23, 2011 || Haleakala || Pan-STARRS ||  || align=right | 1.5 km || 
|-id=811 bgcolor=#E9E9E9
| 549811 ||  || — || September 26, 2011 || Haleakala || Pan-STARRS ||  || align=right | 1.8 km || 
|-id=812 bgcolor=#E9E9E9
| 549812 ||  || — || September 29, 2011 || Mount Lemmon || Mount Lemmon Survey ||  || align=right | 1.7 km || 
|-id=813 bgcolor=#E9E9E9
| 549813 ||  || — || September 23, 2011 || Haleakala || Pan-STARRS ||  || align=right data-sort-value="0.82" | 820 m || 
|-id=814 bgcolor=#E9E9E9
| 549814 ||  || — || September 21, 2011 || Haleakala || Pan-STARRS ||  || align=right | 1.8 km || 
|-id=815 bgcolor=#E9E9E9
| 549815 ||  || — || September 23, 2011 || Haleakala || Pan-STARRS ||  || align=right | 2.4 km || 
|-id=816 bgcolor=#E9E9E9
| 549816 ||  || — || August 22, 2007 || Kitt Peak || Spacewatch ||  || align=right | 1.3 km || 
|-id=817 bgcolor=#fefefe
| 549817 ||  || — || August 10, 2007 || Kitt Peak || Spacewatch ||  || align=right data-sort-value="0.68" | 680 m || 
|-id=818 bgcolor=#E9E9E9
| 549818 ||  || — || September 4, 2011 || Haleakala || Pan-STARRS ||  || align=right | 2.0 km || 
|-id=819 bgcolor=#E9E9E9
| 549819 ||  || — || October 3, 2011 || Mount Lemmon || Mount Lemmon Survey ||  || align=right | 2.0 km || 
|-id=820 bgcolor=#E9E9E9
| 549820 ||  || — || October 1, 2011 || Kitt Peak || Spacewatch ||  || align=right | 1.1 km || 
|-id=821 bgcolor=#E9E9E9
| 549821 ||  || — || October 3, 2011 || Siding Spring || SSS ||  || align=right | 1.9 km || 
|-id=822 bgcolor=#fefefe
| 549822 ||  || — || January 1, 2009 || Kitt Peak || Spacewatch ||  || align=right data-sort-value="0.80" | 800 m || 
|-id=823 bgcolor=#fefefe
| 549823 ||  || — || March 18, 2010 || Kitt Peak || Spacewatch ||  || align=right data-sort-value="0.62" | 620 m || 
|-id=824 bgcolor=#E9E9E9
| 549824 ||  || — || September 18, 2011 || Mount Lemmon || Mount Lemmon Survey ||  || align=right | 1.6 km || 
|-id=825 bgcolor=#E9E9E9
| 549825 ||  || — || February 20, 2009 || Mount Lemmon || Mount Lemmon Survey ||  || align=right | 2.1 km || 
|-id=826 bgcolor=#E9E9E9
| 549826 ||  || — || October 17, 2011 || Kitt Peak || Spacewatch ||  || align=right | 2.9 km || 
|-id=827 bgcolor=#fefefe
| 549827 ||  || — || October 19, 2011 || Mount Lemmon || Mount Lemmon Survey ||  || align=right data-sort-value="0.87" | 870 m || 
|-id=828 bgcolor=#E9E9E9
| 549828 ||  || — || January 27, 2004 || Catalina || CSS ||  || align=right | 1.8 km || 
|-id=829 bgcolor=#E9E9E9
| 549829 ||  || — || August 22, 2006 || Palomar || NEAT || GEF || align=right | 1.4 km || 
|-id=830 bgcolor=#d6d6d6
| 549830 ||  || — || September 17, 2006 || Kitt Peak || Spacewatch ||  || align=right | 2.0 km || 
|-id=831 bgcolor=#fefefe
| 549831 ||  || — || December 29, 2008 || Kitt Peak || Spacewatch || MAS || align=right data-sort-value="0.78" | 780 m || 
|-id=832 bgcolor=#fefefe
| 549832 ||  || — || July 23, 2003 || Palomar || NEAT ||  || align=right data-sort-value="0.98" | 980 m || 
|-id=833 bgcolor=#E9E9E9
| 549833 ||  || — || May 4, 2005 || Mauna Kea || Mauna Kea Obs. || KON || align=right | 1.7 km || 
|-id=834 bgcolor=#fefefe
| 549834 ||  || — || October 18, 2011 || Kitt Peak || Spacewatch ||  || align=right data-sort-value="0.62" | 620 m || 
|-id=835 bgcolor=#E9E9E9
| 549835 ||  || — || October 18, 2011 || Mount Lemmon || Mount Lemmon Survey ||  || align=right | 1.2 km || 
|-id=836 bgcolor=#fefefe
| 549836 ||  || — || February 14, 2009 || Catalina || CSS ||  || align=right data-sort-value="0.99" | 990 m || 
|-id=837 bgcolor=#E9E9E9
| 549837 ||  || — || October 19, 2011 || Kitt Peak || Spacewatch ||  || align=right | 1.2 km || 
|-id=838 bgcolor=#d6d6d6
| 549838 ||  || — || December 30, 2007 || Mount Lemmon || Mount Lemmon Survey ||  || align=right | 1.8 km || 
|-id=839 bgcolor=#E9E9E9
| 549839 ||  || — || January 16, 2004 || Kitt Peak || Spacewatch ||  || align=right | 1.0 km || 
|-id=840 bgcolor=#E9E9E9
| 549840 ||  || — || October 19, 2011 || Kitt Peak || Spacewatch ||  || align=right | 1.7 km || 
|-id=841 bgcolor=#E9E9E9
| 549841 ||  || — || November 5, 2007 || Kitt Peak || Spacewatch ||  || align=right | 1.1 km || 
|-id=842 bgcolor=#E9E9E9
| 549842 ||  || — || November 5, 2007 || Kitt Peak || Spacewatch ||  || align=right data-sort-value="0.86" | 860 m || 
|-id=843 bgcolor=#E9E9E9
| 549843 ||  || — || October 19, 2011 || Kitt Peak || Spacewatch ||  || align=right | 1.1 km || 
|-id=844 bgcolor=#fefefe
| 549844 ||  || — || September 11, 2007 || Kitt Peak || Spacewatch ||  || align=right data-sort-value="0.80" | 800 m || 
|-id=845 bgcolor=#E9E9E9
| 549845 ||  || — || October 20, 2011 || Mount Lemmon || Mount Lemmon Survey ||  || align=right | 1.5 km || 
|-id=846 bgcolor=#E9E9E9
| 549846 ||  || — || September 17, 2006 || Kitt Peak || Spacewatch ||  || align=right | 1.6 km || 
|-id=847 bgcolor=#E9E9E9
| 549847 ||  || — || October 20, 2011 || Kitt Peak || Spacewatch ||  || align=right | 1.3 km || 
|-id=848 bgcolor=#fefefe
| 549848 ||  || — || September 11, 2007 || Kitt Peak || Spacewatch ||  || align=right data-sort-value="0.85" | 850 m || 
|-id=849 bgcolor=#fefefe
| 549849 ||  || — || August 3, 2008 || Siding Spring || SSS || H || align=right data-sort-value="0.65" | 650 m || 
|-id=850 bgcolor=#E9E9E9
| 549850 ||  || — || August 22, 2006 || Palomar || NEAT ||  || align=right | 2.4 km || 
|-id=851 bgcolor=#fefefe
| 549851 ||  || — || November 4, 2004 || Kitt Peak || Spacewatch ||  || align=right data-sort-value="0.75" | 750 m || 
|-id=852 bgcolor=#E9E9E9
| 549852 ||  || — || October 23, 2011 || Kitt Peak || Spacewatch ||  || align=right data-sort-value="0.82" | 820 m || 
|-id=853 bgcolor=#E9E9E9
| 549853 ||  || — || November 30, 2003 || Kitt Peak || Spacewatch ||  || align=right data-sort-value="0.94" | 940 m || 
|-id=854 bgcolor=#E9E9E9
| 549854 ||  || — || October 23, 2011 || Mount Lemmon || Mount Lemmon Survey ||  || align=right | 1.2 km || 
|-id=855 bgcolor=#E9E9E9
| 549855 ||  || — || October 20, 2011 || Kitt Peak || Spacewatch ||  || align=right | 1.5 km || 
|-id=856 bgcolor=#fefefe
| 549856 ||  || — || October 24, 2011 || Haleakala || Pan-STARRS || H || align=right data-sort-value="0.82" | 820 m || 
|-id=857 bgcolor=#E9E9E9
| 549857 ||  || — || October 21, 2011 || Mount Lemmon || Mount Lemmon Survey ||  || align=right data-sort-value="0.90" | 900 m || 
|-id=858 bgcolor=#fefefe
| 549858 ||  || — || October 24, 2011 || Mount Lemmon || Mount Lemmon Survey ||  || align=right data-sort-value="0.83" | 830 m || 
|-id=859 bgcolor=#E9E9E9
| 549859 ||  || — || May 16, 2005 || Kitt Peak || Spacewatch ||  || align=right data-sort-value="0.99" | 990 m || 
|-id=860 bgcolor=#E9E9E9
| 549860 ||  || — || October 26, 2011 || Haleakala || Pan-STARRS ||  || align=right data-sort-value="0.86" | 860 m || 
|-id=861 bgcolor=#E9E9E9
| 549861 ||  || — || August 17, 2006 || Palomar || NEAT ||  || align=right | 2.5 km || 
|-id=862 bgcolor=#E9E9E9
| 549862 ||  || — || September 4, 2011 || Haleakala || Pan-STARRS ||  || align=right data-sort-value="0.71" | 710 m || 
|-id=863 bgcolor=#fefefe
| 549863 ||  || — || June 22, 2007 || Siding Spring || SSS ||  || align=right data-sort-value="0.82" | 820 m || 
|-id=864 bgcolor=#E9E9E9
| 549864 ||  || — || September 23, 2011 || Kitt Peak || Spacewatch ||  || align=right data-sort-value="0.98" | 980 m || 
|-id=865 bgcolor=#E9E9E9
| 549865 ||  || — || September 21, 2003 || Kitt Peak || Spacewatch ||  || align=right data-sort-value="0.86" | 860 m || 
|-id=866 bgcolor=#E9E9E9
| 549866 ||  || — || September 27, 2011 || Mount Lemmon || Mount Lemmon Survey ||  || align=right data-sort-value="0.82" | 820 m || 
|-id=867 bgcolor=#fefefe
| 549867 ||  || — || September 20, 2003 || Kitt Peak || Spacewatch ||  || align=right | 1.0 km || 
|-id=868 bgcolor=#E9E9E9
| 549868 ||  || — || March 9, 2000 || Kitt Peak || Spacewatch ||  || align=right data-sort-value="0.86" | 860 m || 
|-id=869 bgcolor=#E9E9E9
| 549869 ||  || — || October 25, 2011 || Haleakala || Pan-STARRS ||  || align=right data-sort-value="0.78" | 780 m || 
|-id=870 bgcolor=#E9E9E9
| 549870 ||  || — || October 1, 2011 || Piszkesteto || K. Sárneczky ||  || align=right | 1.1 km || 
|-id=871 bgcolor=#E9E9E9
| 549871 ||  || — || October 20, 2011 || Catalina || CSS ||  || align=right | 1.3 km || 
|-id=872 bgcolor=#E9E9E9
| 549872 ||  || — || October 5, 2011 || Piszkesteto || K. Sárneczky ||  || align=right | 1.8 km || 
|-id=873 bgcolor=#E9E9E9
| 549873 Portsevskii ||  ||  || October 26, 2011 || Zelenchukskaya Stn || T. V. Kryachko, B. Satovski || EUN || align=right | 1.5 km || 
|-id=874 bgcolor=#fefefe
| 549874 ||  || — || May 6, 2006 || Mount Lemmon || Mount Lemmon Survey ||  || align=right data-sort-value="0.73" | 730 m || 
|-id=875 bgcolor=#E9E9E9
| 549875 ||  || — || October 29, 2011 || Haleakala || Pan-STARRS ||  || align=right | 2.3 km || 
|-id=876 bgcolor=#d6d6d6
| 549876 ||  || — || October 24, 2011 || Mount Lemmon || Mount Lemmon Survey ||  || align=right | 1.6 km || 
|-id=877 bgcolor=#E9E9E9
| 549877 ||  || — || October 20, 2011 || Haleakala || Haleakala-Faulkes ||  || align=right | 2.0 km || 
|-id=878 bgcolor=#d6d6d6
| 549878 ||  || — || January 17, 2013 || Haleakala || Pan-STARRS ||  || align=right | 1.6 km || 
|-id=879 bgcolor=#E9E9E9
| 549879 ||  || — || October 23, 2011 || Kitt Peak || Spacewatch ||  || align=right | 1.5 km || 
|-id=880 bgcolor=#E9E9E9
| 549880 ||  || — || October 18, 2011 || Kitt Peak || Spacewatch ||  || align=right | 1.8 km || 
|-id=881 bgcolor=#d6d6d6
| 549881 ||  || — || September 21, 2001 || Kitt Peak || Spacewatch || KOR || align=right | 1.4 km || 
|-id=882 bgcolor=#d6d6d6
| 549882 ||  || — || October 19, 2006 || Kitt Peak || Spacewatch ||  || align=right | 1.9 km || 
|-id=883 bgcolor=#E9E9E9
| 549883 ||  || — || January 18, 2004 || Palomar || NEAT ||  || align=right | 1.4 km || 
|-id=884 bgcolor=#E9E9E9
| 549884 ||  || — || August 30, 2011 || Haleakala || Pan-STARRS ||  || align=right | 2.1 km || 
|-id=885 bgcolor=#E9E9E9
| 549885 ||  || — || October 24, 2011 || Kitt Peak || Spacewatch ||  || align=right | 2.7 km || 
|-id=886 bgcolor=#d6d6d6
| 549886 ||  || — || October 20, 2011 || Kitt Peak || Spacewatch ||  || align=right | 2.2 km || 
|-id=887 bgcolor=#fefefe
| 549887 ||  || — || September 24, 2011 || Haleakala || Pan-STARRS ||  || align=right data-sort-value="0.86" | 860 m || 
|-id=888 bgcolor=#E9E9E9
| 549888 ||  || — || October 26, 2011 || Haleakala || Pan-STARRS ||  || align=right data-sort-value="0.98" | 980 m || 
|-id=889 bgcolor=#E9E9E9
| 549889 ||  || — || December 18, 2007 || Kitt Peak || Spacewatch ||  || align=right | 1.0 km || 
|-id=890 bgcolor=#E9E9E9
| 549890 ||  || — || October 30, 2011 || Kitt Peak || Spacewatch ||  || align=right | 1.3 km || 
|-id=891 bgcolor=#fefefe
| 549891 ||  || — || April 8, 2002 || Palomar || NEAT ||  || align=right | 1.0 km || 
|-id=892 bgcolor=#E9E9E9
| 549892 ||  || — || October 30, 2011 || XuYi || PMO NEO ||  || align=right | 1.8 km || 
|-id=893 bgcolor=#E9E9E9
| 549893 ||  || — || August 20, 2002 || Palomar || NEAT ||  || align=right | 2.1 km || 
|-id=894 bgcolor=#E9E9E9
| 549894 ||  || — || January 17, 2004 || Palomar || NEAT || ADE || align=right | 2.0 km || 
|-id=895 bgcolor=#E9E9E9
| 549895 ||  || — || September 9, 2002 || Palomar || NEAT ||  || align=right | 1.9 km || 
|-id=896 bgcolor=#fefefe
| 549896 ||  || — || February 4, 2009 || Kitt Peak || Spacewatch ||  || align=right data-sort-value="0.92" | 920 m || 
|-id=897 bgcolor=#E9E9E9
| 549897 ||  || — || December 5, 2007 || Kitt Peak || Spacewatch ||  || align=right | 1.9 km || 
|-id=898 bgcolor=#d6d6d6
| 549898 ||  || — || September 15, 2006 || Kitt Peak || Spacewatch ||  || align=right | 1.7 km || 
|-id=899 bgcolor=#E9E9E9
| 549899 ||  || — || September 8, 2007 || Mount Lemmon || Mount Lemmon Survey ||  || align=right data-sort-value="0.75" | 750 m || 
|-id=900 bgcolor=#E9E9E9
| 549900 ||  || — || October 20, 2011 || Mount Lemmon || Mount Lemmon Survey ||  || align=right | 1.6 km || 
|}

549901–550000 

|-bgcolor=#E9E9E9
| 549901 ||  || — || February 26, 2009 || Kitt Peak || Spacewatch ||  || align=right data-sort-value="0.78" | 780 m || 
|-id=902 bgcolor=#E9E9E9
| 549902 ||  || — || October 21, 2011 || Mount Lemmon || Mount Lemmon Survey ||  || align=right | 1.5 km || 
|-id=903 bgcolor=#d6d6d6
| 549903 ||  || — || December 30, 2007 || Kitt Peak || Spacewatch ||  || align=right | 1.6 km || 
|-id=904 bgcolor=#E9E9E9
| 549904 ||  || — || November 11, 2007 || Mount Lemmon || Mount Lemmon Survey ||  || align=right | 1.0 km || 
|-id=905 bgcolor=#E9E9E9
| 549905 ||  || — || October 23, 2011 || Mount Lemmon || Mount Lemmon Survey ||  || align=right data-sort-value="0.86" | 860 m || 
|-id=906 bgcolor=#E9E9E9
| 549906 ||  || — || December 4, 2007 || Kitt Peak || Spacewatch ||  || align=right data-sort-value="0.86" | 860 m || 
|-id=907 bgcolor=#E9E9E9
| 549907 ||  || — || October 26, 2011 || Haleakala || Pan-STARRS ||  || align=right | 1.8 km || 
|-id=908 bgcolor=#E9E9E9
| 549908 ||  || — || January 28, 2004 || Socorro || LINEAR ||  || align=right | 2.0 km || 
|-id=909 bgcolor=#fefefe
| 549909 ||  || — || September 24, 2011 || Haleakala || Pan-STARRS ||  || align=right data-sort-value="0.69" | 690 m || 
|-id=910 bgcolor=#E9E9E9
| 549910 ||  || — || December 25, 2003 || Haleakala || AMOS ||  || align=right | 1.3 km || 
|-id=911 bgcolor=#E9E9E9
| 549911 ||  || — || October 18, 2007 || Mount Lemmon || Mount Lemmon Survey ||  || align=right data-sort-value="0.94" | 940 m || 
|-id=912 bgcolor=#E9E9E9
| 549912 ||  || — || February 8, 2008 || Kitt Peak || Spacewatch ||  || align=right | 1.5 km || 
|-id=913 bgcolor=#E9E9E9
| 549913 ||  || — || August 13, 2002 || Palomar || NEAT ||  || align=right | 1.8 km || 
|-id=914 bgcolor=#fefefe
| 549914 ||  || — || October 24, 2011 || Mount Lemmon || Mount Lemmon Survey ||  || align=right data-sort-value="0.98" | 980 m || 
|-id=915 bgcolor=#fefefe
| 549915 ||  || — || October 5, 2007 || Kitt Peak || Spacewatch ||  || align=right data-sort-value="0.83" | 830 m || 
|-id=916 bgcolor=#E9E9E9
| 549916 ||  || — || October 25, 2011 || Haleakala || Pan-STARRS ||  || align=right | 1.4 km || 
|-id=917 bgcolor=#E9E9E9
| 549917 ||  || — || October 25, 2011 || Haleakala || Pan-STARRS ||  || align=right data-sort-value="0.97" | 970 m || 
|-id=918 bgcolor=#d6d6d6
| 549918 ||  || — || October 20, 2011 || Mount Lemmon || Mount Lemmon Survey || 7:4 || align=right | 3.4 km || 
|-id=919 bgcolor=#E9E9E9
| 549919 ||  || — || October 24, 2011 || Haleakala || Pan-STARRS ||  || align=right | 1.4 km || 
|-id=920 bgcolor=#E9E9E9
| 549920 ||  || — || February 3, 2013 || Haleakala || Pan-STARRS ||  || align=right | 1.8 km || 
|-id=921 bgcolor=#E9E9E9
| 549921 ||  || — || October 24, 2011 || Kitt Peak || Spacewatch ||  || align=right data-sort-value="0.86" | 860 m || 
|-id=922 bgcolor=#E9E9E9
| 549922 ||  || — || April 16, 2013 || Haleakala || Pan-STARRS ||  || align=right | 1.3 km || 
|-id=923 bgcolor=#fefefe
| 549923 ||  || — || November 6, 2015 || Haleakala || Pan-STARRS ||  || align=right data-sort-value="0.75" | 750 m || 
|-id=924 bgcolor=#d6d6d6
| 549924 ||  || — || September 8, 2015 || Haleakala || Pan-STARRS ||  || align=right | 2.2 km || 
|-id=925 bgcolor=#E9E9E9
| 549925 ||  || — || October 23, 2011 || Haleakala || Pan-STARRS ||  || align=right | 1.1 km || 
|-id=926 bgcolor=#fefefe
| 549926 ||  || — || October 1, 2011 || Kitt Peak || Spacewatch ||  || align=right data-sort-value="0.78" | 780 m || 
|-id=927 bgcolor=#E9E9E9
| 549927 ||  || — || January 29, 2017 || Haleakala || Pan-STARRS ||  || align=right data-sort-value="0.86" | 860 m || 
|-id=928 bgcolor=#E9E9E9
| 549928 ||  || — || October 24, 2011 || Kitt Peak || Spacewatch ||  || align=right | 2.1 km || 
|-id=929 bgcolor=#E9E9E9
| 549929 ||  || — || June 17, 2018 || Haleakala || Pan-STARRS ||  || align=right data-sort-value="0.82" | 820 m || 
|-id=930 bgcolor=#E9E9E9
| 549930 ||  || — || February 13, 2013 || Haleakala || Pan-STARRS ||  || align=right data-sort-value="0.71" | 710 m || 
|-id=931 bgcolor=#E9E9E9
| 549931 ||  || — || October 25, 2011 || Haleakala || Pan-STARRS ||  || align=right data-sort-value="0.94" | 940 m || 
|-id=932 bgcolor=#E9E9E9
| 549932 ||  || — || March 13, 2013 || Haleakala || Pan-STARRS ||  || align=right data-sort-value="0.68" | 680 m || 
|-id=933 bgcolor=#E9E9E9
| 549933 ||  || — || October 26, 2011 || Haleakala || Pan-STARRS ||  || align=right | 1.3 km || 
|-id=934 bgcolor=#d6d6d6
| 549934 ||  || — || October 29, 2011 || Kitt Peak || Spacewatch ||  || align=right | 1.8 km || 
|-id=935 bgcolor=#E9E9E9
| 549935 ||  || — || October 21, 2011 || Mount Lemmon || Mount Lemmon Survey ||  || align=right | 1.2 km || 
|-id=936 bgcolor=#E9E9E9
| 549936 ||  || — || October 28, 2011 || Mount Lemmon || Mount Lemmon Survey ||  || align=right | 1.2 km || 
|-id=937 bgcolor=#E9E9E9
| 549937 ||  || — || October 25, 2011 || Haleakala || Pan-STARRS ||  || align=right | 2.1 km || 
|-id=938 bgcolor=#E9E9E9
| 549938 ||  || — || October 26, 2011 || Haleakala || Pan-STARRS ||  || align=right | 1.8 km || 
|-id=939 bgcolor=#E9E9E9
| 549939 ||  || — || October 24, 2011 || Haleakala || Pan-STARRS ||  || align=right data-sort-value="0.92" | 920 m || 
|-id=940 bgcolor=#fefefe
| 549940 ||  || — || March 19, 2010 || Mount Lemmon || Mount Lemmon Survey ||  || align=right data-sort-value="0.94" | 940 m || 
|-id=941 bgcolor=#d6d6d6
| 549941 ||  || — || November 1, 2011 || Mount Lemmon || Mount Lemmon Survey ||  || align=right | 1.6 km || 
|-id=942 bgcolor=#d6d6d6
| 549942 ||  || — || September 26, 2006 || Mount Lemmon || Mount Lemmon Survey ||  || align=right | 1.8 km || 
|-id=943 bgcolor=#E9E9E9
| 549943 ||  || — || October 19, 2007 || Mount Lemmon || Mount Lemmon Survey ||  || align=right data-sort-value="0.75" | 750 m || 
|-id=944 bgcolor=#E9E9E9
| 549944 ||  || — || November 3, 2011 || Mount Lemmon || Mount Lemmon Survey ||  || align=right data-sort-value="0.98" | 980 m || 
|-id=945 bgcolor=#E9E9E9
| 549945 ||  || — || November 8, 2007 || Mount Lemmon || Mount Lemmon Survey ||  || align=right data-sort-value="0.90" | 900 m || 
|-id=946 bgcolor=#d6d6d6
| 549946 ||  || — || October 3, 2005 || Palomar || NEAT ||  || align=right | 3.9 km || 
|-id=947 bgcolor=#E9E9E9
| 549947 ||  || — || November 2, 2011 || Mount Lemmon || Mount Lemmon Survey ||  || align=right | 2.4 km || 
|-id=948 bgcolor=#FFC2E0
| 549948 ||  || — || November 16, 2011 || Socorro || LINEAR || APOPHA || align=right data-sort-value="0.26" | 260 m || 
|-id=949 bgcolor=#E9E9E9
| 549949 ||  || — || November 16, 2011 || Mount Lemmon || Mount Lemmon Survey ||  || align=right data-sort-value="0.82" | 820 m || 
|-id=950 bgcolor=#d6d6d6
| 549950 ||  || — || November 16, 2011 || Mount Lemmon || Mount Lemmon Survey ||  || align=right | 2.1 km || 
|-id=951 bgcolor=#E9E9E9
| 549951 ||  || — || October 24, 2011 || Haleakala || Pan-STARRS ||  || align=right data-sort-value="0.90" | 900 m || 
|-id=952 bgcolor=#E9E9E9
| 549952 ||  || — || October 26, 2011 || Haleakala || Pan-STARRS ||  || align=right data-sort-value="0.78" | 780 m || 
|-id=953 bgcolor=#E9E9E9
| 549953 ||  || — || January 17, 2004 || Palomar || NEAT || EUN || align=right | 1.4 km || 
|-id=954 bgcolor=#fefefe
| 549954 ||  || — || September 24, 2011 || Haleakala || Pan-STARRS ||  || align=right data-sort-value="0.82" | 820 m || 
|-id=955 bgcolor=#E9E9E9
| 549955 ||  || — || November 17, 2011 || Mount Lemmon || Mount Lemmon Survey ||  || align=right | 1.1 km || 
|-id=956 bgcolor=#E9E9E9
| 549956 ||  || — || November 2, 2011 || Kitt Peak || Spacewatch ||  || align=right | 1.3 km || 
|-id=957 bgcolor=#E9E9E9
| 549957 ||  || — || November 18, 2011 || Mount Lemmon || Mount Lemmon Survey ||  || align=right | 1.1 km || 
|-id=958 bgcolor=#E9E9E9
| 549958 ||  || — || October 25, 2011 || Haleakala || Pan-STARRS ||  || align=right | 1.2 km || 
|-id=959 bgcolor=#E9E9E9
| 549959 ||  || — || October 24, 2011 || Haleakala || Pan-STARRS ||  || align=right | 1.7 km || 
|-id=960 bgcolor=#E9E9E9
| 549960 ||  || — || February 12, 2004 || Kitt Peak || Spacewatch ||  || align=right | 1.2 km || 
|-id=961 bgcolor=#E9E9E9
| 549961 Földesistván ||  ||  || November 23, 2011 || Piszkesteto || A. Pál ||  || align=right | 1.8 km || 
|-id=962 bgcolor=#d6d6d6
| 549962 ||  || — || October 2, 2006 || Mount Lemmon || Mount Lemmon Survey ||  || align=right | 2.3 km || 
|-id=963 bgcolor=#E9E9E9
| 549963 ||  || — || November 8, 2011 || Haleakala || Pan-STARRS ||  || align=right data-sort-value="0.94" | 940 m || 
|-id=964 bgcolor=#fefefe
| 549964 ||  || — || October 25, 2011 || Haleakala || Pan-STARRS || H || align=right data-sort-value="0.50" | 500 m || 
|-id=965 bgcolor=#E9E9E9
| 549965 ||  || — || October 18, 2011 || Kitt Peak || Spacewatch ||  || align=right | 1.9 km || 
|-id=966 bgcolor=#E9E9E9
| 549966 ||  || — || January 30, 2004 || Kitt Peak || Spacewatch ||  || align=right data-sort-value="0.75" | 750 m || 
|-id=967 bgcolor=#E9E9E9
| 549967 ||  || — || November 24, 2011 || Catalina || CSS ||  || align=right | 1.0 km || 
|-id=968 bgcolor=#FA8072
| 549968 ||  || — || October 23, 2011 || Haleakala || Pan-STARRS ||  || align=right | 1.4 km || 
|-id=969 bgcolor=#E9E9E9
| 549969 ||  || — || November 24, 2011 || Haleakala || Pan-STARRS ||  || align=right data-sort-value="0.78" | 780 m || 
|-id=970 bgcolor=#E9E9E9
| 549970 ||  || — || November 23, 2011 || Catalina || CSS ||  || align=right | 1.7 km || 
|-id=971 bgcolor=#fefefe
| 549971 ||  || — || October 19, 2003 || Apache Point || SDSS Collaboration || MAS || align=right data-sort-value="0.78" | 780 m || 
|-id=972 bgcolor=#E9E9E9
| 549972 ||  || — || January 13, 2008 || Kitt Peak || Spacewatch ||  || align=right | 1.3 km || 
|-id=973 bgcolor=#fefefe
| 549973 ||  || — || January 6, 2006 || Mount Lemmon || Mount Lemmon Survey ||  || align=right data-sort-value="0.61" | 610 m || 
|-id=974 bgcolor=#E9E9E9
| 549974 ||  || — || November 24, 2011 || Kitt Peak || Spacewatch ||  || align=right | 1.5 km || 
|-id=975 bgcolor=#E9E9E9
| 549975 ||  || — || October 13, 1998 || Kitt Peak || Spacewatch ||  || align=right | 1.2 km || 
|-id=976 bgcolor=#E9E9E9
| 549976 ||  || — || November 24, 2011 || Haleakala || Pan-STARRS ||  || align=right data-sort-value="0.86" | 860 m || 
|-id=977 bgcolor=#E9E9E9
| 549977 ||  || — || November 18, 2011 || Mount Lemmon || Mount Lemmon Survey ||  || align=right | 1.2 km || 
|-id=978 bgcolor=#E9E9E9
| 549978 ||  || — || November 17, 2011 || Kitt Peak || Spacewatch ||  || align=right | 1.1 km || 
|-id=979 bgcolor=#E9E9E9
| 549979 ||  || — || November 24, 2011 || Kitt Peak || Spacewatch ||  || align=right | 1.2 km || 
|-id=980 bgcolor=#fefefe
| 549980 ||  || — || November 2, 2011 || Mount Lemmon || Mount Lemmon Survey ||  || align=right | 1.1 km || 
|-id=981 bgcolor=#E9E9E9
| 549981 ||  || — || June 14, 2010 || Nogales || M. Schwartz, P. R. Holvorcem ||  || align=right | 2.1 km || 
|-id=982 bgcolor=#E9E9E9
| 549982 ||  || — || November 23, 2011 || Mount Lemmon || Mount Lemmon Survey ||  || align=right data-sort-value="0.78" | 780 m || 
|-id=983 bgcolor=#E9E9E9
| 549983 ||  || — || October 26, 2011 || Haleakala || Pan-STARRS ||  || align=right | 1.1 km || 
|-id=984 bgcolor=#fefefe
| 549984 ||  || — || August 25, 2003 || Palomar || NEAT ||  || align=right data-sort-value="0.94" | 940 m || 
|-id=985 bgcolor=#E9E9E9
| 549985 ||  || — || October 18, 2011 || Haleakala || Pan-STARRS ||  || align=right data-sort-value="0.86" | 860 m || 
|-id=986 bgcolor=#E9E9E9
| 549986 ||  || — || November 27, 2011 || Mount Lemmon || Mount Lemmon Survey ||  || align=right data-sort-value="0.75" | 750 m || 
|-id=987 bgcolor=#E9E9E9
| 549987 ||  || — || November 24, 2011 || Haleakala || Pan-STARRS ||  || align=right | 1.4 km || 
|-id=988 bgcolor=#E9E9E9
| 549988 ||  || — || January 18, 2008 || Kitt Peak || Spacewatch ||  || align=right | 1.5 km || 
|-id=989 bgcolor=#E9E9E9
| 549989 ||  || — || October 23, 2011 || Haleakala || Pan-STARRS ||  || align=right | 2.2 km || 
|-id=990 bgcolor=#E9E9E9
| 549990 ||  || — || November 24, 2011 || Hagen Obs. || M. Klein ||  || align=right | 1.3 km || 
|-id=991 bgcolor=#fefefe
| 549991 ||  || — || September 18, 2007 || Bergisch Gladbach || W. Bickel ||  || align=right data-sort-value="0.75" | 750 m || 
|-id=992 bgcolor=#E9E9E9
| 549992 ||  || — || December 3, 2007 || Kitt Peak || Spacewatch ||  || align=right | 2.1 km || 
|-id=993 bgcolor=#E9E9E9
| 549993 ||  || — || October 23, 2011 || Kitt Peak || Spacewatch ||  || align=right data-sort-value="0.96" | 960 m || 
|-id=994 bgcolor=#E9E9E9
| 549994 ||  || — || March 18, 2004 || Apache Point || SDSS Collaboration ||  || align=right | 1.1 km || 
|-id=995 bgcolor=#E9E9E9
| 549995 ||  || — || April 21, 2009 || Mount Lemmon || Mount Lemmon Survey ||  || align=right | 1.0 km || 
|-id=996 bgcolor=#fefefe
| 549996 Dmitriiguliutin ||  ||  || October 31, 2011 || Zelenchukskaya Stn || T. V. Kryachko, B. Satovski || H || align=right data-sort-value="0.62" | 620 m || 
|-id=997 bgcolor=#E9E9E9
| 549997 ||  || — || November 18, 2011 || Mount Lemmon || Mount Lemmon Survey ||  || align=right data-sort-value="0.98" | 980 m || 
|-id=998 bgcolor=#C2FFFF
| 549998 ||  || — || November 25, 2011 || Haleakala || Pan-STARRS || L4 || align=right | 9.2 km || 
|-id=999 bgcolor=#E9E9E9
| 549999 ||  || — || November 30, 2011 || Kitt Peak || Spacewatch ||  || align=right data-sort-value="0.98" | 980 m || 
|-id=000 bgcolor=#E9E9E9
| 550000 ||  || — || May 11, 2005 || Mount Lemmon || Mount Lemmon Survey ||  || align=right | 1.4 km || 
|}

References

External links 
 Discovery Circumstances: Numbered Minor Planets (545001)–(550000) (IAU Minor Planet Center)

0549